This is a list of territorial governors in the 20th century (1901–2000) AD, such as the administrators of colonies, protectorates, or other dependencies. Where applicable, native rulers are also listed.

For the purposes of this list, a current dependency is any entity listed on these lists of dependent territories and other entities. A dependent territory is normally a territory that does not possess full political independence or sovereignty as a sovereign state yet remains politically outside of the controlling state's integral area. This latter condition distinguishes a dependent territory from an autonomous region or administrative division, which forms an integral part of the 'parent' state. The administrators of uninhabited territories are excluded.

Australia
Australia
Monarchs
Prime ministers

Administrators of the Australian Indian Ocean Territories:
Note: administrates Christmas Island (since 1998) and Cocos (Keeling) Islands (since 1996)
Danny Ambrose Gillespie, administrator (1994–1996)
Ron Harvey, administrator (1997–1998)
Bill Taylor, administrator (1999–2003)

Christmas Island, territory
Administrators, until 1998
Donald Evan Nickels, Official representative (1958–1960)
John William Stokes, Official representative (1960–1966)
Charles Ivens Buffett, Official representative (1966–1968)
Leslie Dudley King, administrator (1968–1970)
John Sampson White, administrator (1970–1973)
Frank Evatt, administrator (1973–1974)
Harry Webb, administrator (1974–1975)
William Worth, administrator (1975–1977)
Francis Charles Boyle, administrator (1977–1980)
Mac Holten, administrator (1980–1982)
William Yates, administrator (1982–1983)
Thomas Ferguson Paterson, administrator (1983–1986)
C. Stephens, acting administrator (1986)
Alexander Taylor, administrator (1986–1990)
William Albany McKenzie, administrator (1990–1991)
A. Mitchell, acting administrator (1991)
P. Gifford, acting administrator (1991–1992)
Michael John Grimes, administrator (1992–1994)
Peter Woods, acting administrator (1994)
Danny Ambrose Gillespie, administrator (1994–1996)
Merrilyn Ann Chilvers, acting administrator (1996–1997)
Graham Nicholls, acting administrator (1997)
Ronald Harvey, administrator (1997–1998)
President of the Christmas Island Shire Council
Lillian Oh, President (1992–1995)
Jeffery Tan, Acting President (1995–1997)
Andrew Smolders, President (1998–1999)
Dave McLane, President (1999–2001)

Cocos (Keeling) Islands, territory
Administrators, until 1996
Charles Ivens Buffett, administrator (1977–1980)
President of the Shire of Cocos
Parson bin Yapat, Chairmen (1979–1981)
Wahin bin Bynie, Chairmen (1981–1983)
Parson bin Yapat, Chairmen (1983–1993)
Ron Grant, President (1993–1995)
Radal bin Feyrel, President (1995–1999)
Mohammad Said Chongkin, President (1999–2001)

Norfolk Island, territory
Administrators
Robert Nixon Dalkin, administrator (1968–1972)	
Desmond Vincent O'Leary, administrator (1976–1979)
Peter Coleman, administrator (1979–1981)
Ian Hutchinson, acting administrator (1981)
Thomas Ferguson Paterson, acting administrator (1981–1982)
Tony Messner, administrator (1997–2003)
Heads of government
William M. Randall, President of the Island council (1967–1974)
William Arthur Blucher, President of the Island council (1976–1978)
David Buffett, Chief minister (1979–1986)	
George Charles Smith, Chief Minister (1997–2000)
Ronald Coane Nobbs, Chief Minister (2000–2001)

Territory of New Guinea
Administrators

Territory of Papua
Administrators

Territory of Papua and New Guinea
Administrators (Papua and New Guinea)
Jack Keith Murray, administrator (1945–1952)
Donald Cleland, administrator (1952–1966)
David Hay, administrator (1966–1970)
Leslie Johnson, administrator (1970–1973), High commissioner (1973–1974)
High commissioners (Papua New Guinea)
Leslie Johnson, administrator (1970–1973), High commissioner (1973–1974)
Tom Critchley, High commissioner (1974–1975)

Belgium
Belgium Belgian colonial empire
Monarchs
Prime ministers

Belgian Congo
Governors general
Théophile Wahis, Governor general (1908–1912)
Félix Fuchs, Governor general (1912–1916)
Eugène Henry, Governor general (1916–1921)
Maurice Lippens, Governor general (1921–1923)
Martin Rutten, Governor general (1923–1927)
Auguste Tilkens, Governor general (1927–1934)
Auguste Tilkens, Governor general (1927–1934)
Pierre Ryckmans, Governor general (1934–1946)
Eugène Jungers, Governor general (1947–1951)
Léon Pétillon, Governor general (1952–1958)
Henri Cornelis, Governor general (1958–1960)

China
People's Republic of China
Party chairmen
Presidents
Premiers

Hong Kong, special administrative region
Chief executives
Tung Chee-hwa, Chief executive (1997–2005)

Macau, special administrative region
Chief executives
Edmund Ho Hau Wah, Chief executive (1999–2009)

Denmark
Denmark
Monarchs
Prime ministers

Faroe Islands, autonomous territory
High commissioners 
Cai A. Vagn-Hansen, High commissioner (1948–1954)
Niels Elkær-Hansen, High commissioner (1954–1961)
Mogens Wahl, High commissioner (1961–1972)
Leif Groth, High commissioner (1972–1981)
Niels Bentsen, High commissioner (1981–1988)
Bent Klinte, High commissioner (1988–1995)
Vibeke Larsen, High commissioner (1995–2001)
Prime ministers
Andrass Samuelsen, Prime minister (1948–1950)
Kristian Djurhuus, Prime minister (1950–1959)
Peter Mohr Dam, Prime minister (1959–1963)
Hákun Djurhuus, Prime minister (1963–1967)
Peter Mohr Dam, Prime minister (1967–1968)
Kristian Djurhuus, Prime minister (1968–1970)
Atli Dam, Prime minister (1970–1981)
Pauli Ellefsen, Prime minister (1981–1985)
Atli Dam, Prime minister (1985–1989)
Jógvan Sundstein, Prime minister (1989–1991)
Atli Dam, Prime minister (1991–1993)
Marita Petersen, Prime minister (1993–1994)
Edmund Joensen, Prime minister (1994–1998)
Anfinn Kallsberg, Prime minister (1998–2004)

Greenland, autonomous territory
Governors 
Hans Lassen, Governor (1973–1979)
High commissioners 
Torben Hede Pedersen, High commissioner (1979–1992)
Steen Spore, High commissioner (1992–1995)
Gunnar Martens, High commissioner (1995–2002)
Prime ministers
Jonathan Motzfeldt, Prime minister (1979–1991)
Lars Emil Johansen, Prime minister (1991–1997)
Jonathan Motzfeldt, Prime minister (1997–2002)

Finland
Finland 
Presidents
Prime ministers

Åland, autonomous region
Governors
Hjalmar von Bonsdorff, Governor (1918)
William Isaksson, Governor (1918–1922)
Lars Wilhelm Fagerlund, Governor (1922–1937)
Torsten Rothberg, Governor (1938)
Ruben Österberg, Governor (1939–1945)
Herman Koroleff, Governor (1945–1953)
Tor Brenning, Governor (1954–1972)
Martin Isaksson, Governor (1972–1982)
Henrik Gustafsson, Governor (1982–1999)
Peter Lindbäck, Governor (1999–2009)
Premiers of Åland
Carl Björkman, Premier (1922–1938)
Viktor Strandfält, Premier (1938–1955)
Hugo Johansson, Premier (1955–1967)
Martin Isaksson, Premier (1967–1972)
Alarik Häggblom, Premier (1972–1979)
Folke Woivalin, Premier (1979–1988)
Sune Eriksson, Premier (1988–1991)
Ragnar Erlandsson, Premier (1991–1995)
Roger Jansson, Premier (1995–1999)
Roger Nordlund, Premier (1999–2007)

France
French Third Republic, Vichy France, French Fourth Republic, French Fifth Republic 
Heads of state
Prime ministers

Africa

French Dahomey
Governors, Lieutenant governors
Jean Desanti, acting Lieutenant governor (1934–1935)
Maurice Léon Bourgine, Lieutenant governor (1935–1937)

French Guinea
Lieutenant governors, Governors
Paul Jean François Cousturier, Lieutenant governor (1900–1904)
Antoine Marie Frezouls, Lieutenant governor (1904–1906)
Jules Louis Richard, Acting Lieutenant governor (1906–1907)
Joost van Vollenhouven, Acting Lieutenant governor (1907)
Georges Poulet, Acting Lieutenant governor (1907–1908)
Victor Théophile Liotard, Lieutenant governor (1908–1910)
Georges Poulet, Acting Lieutenant governor (1910)
Camille Guy, Lieutenant governor (1910–1912)
Jean Louis Georges Poiret, Acting Lieutenant governor (1912–1913)
Jean Jules Émile Peuvergne, Lieutenant governor (1913–1915)
Jean Louis Georges Poiret, Lieutenant governor (1915–1919)
Fernand Lavit, Acting Lieutenant governor (1919–1920)
Jean Louis Georges Poiret, Lieutenant governor (1920–1922)
Jules Vidal, Acting Lieutenant governor (1922)
Jean Louis Georges Poiret, Lieutenant governor (1922–1925)
Robert Simon, Acting Lieutenant governor (1925)
Jean Louis Georges Poiret, Lieutenant governor (1925–1927)
Antoine Paladi, Lieutenant governor (1927–1928)
Jean-Claude Tissier, Acting Lieutenant governor (1928)
Jean Louis Georges Poiret, Lieutenant governor (1928–1929)
Louis François Antonin, Acting Lieutenant governor (1929–1931)
Robert Paul Marie de Guise, Lieutenant governor (1931–1932)
Joseph Vadier, Lieutenant governor (1932–1933)
Antoine Paladi, Acting Lieutenant governor (1933)
Joseph Vadier, Lieutenant governor (1933–1935)
Louis Placide Blacher, Acting Lieutenant governor (1935)
Joseph Vadier, Lieutenant governor (1935–1936)
Joseph Vadier, Lieutenant governor (1935–1936)
Louis Placide Blacher, Governor (1936–1937)
Louis Placide Blacher, Governor (1936–1937)
Pierre Tap, Acting Governor (1937–1938)
Louis-Placide Blacher, Governor (1938–1939)
Felix Martine, Acting Governor (1939)
Louis-Placide Blacher, Governor (1939–1940)
Antoine Félix Giacobbi, Governor (1940–1942)
Horace Valentin Crocicchia, Governor (1942–1944)
Jacques Georges Fourneau, Acting Governor (1944–1946)
Édouard Louis Terrac, Governor (1946–1948)
Roland Pré, Governor (1948–1951)
Roland Pré, Governor (1948–1951)
Roland Pré, Governor (1948–1951)
Paul Henri Sirieix, Governor (1951–1953)
Jean Paul Parisot, Governor (1953–1955)
Charles-Henri Bonfils, Governor (1955–1956)
Jean Paul Ramadier, Governor (1956–1958)
Jean Mauberna, Acting Governor (1958)

Mayotte
Prefects
Jean Coussirou, Prefect (1976–1978)
Jean Rigotard, Prefect (1978–1980)
Philippe Jacques Nicolas Kessler, Prefect (1980–1981)
Pierre Sevellec, Prefect (1981–1982)
Presidents of the General council
Younoussa Bamana, President (1976–1991)

French Somaliland
Governors
Louis Ormiéres, Acting Governor (1901–1902)
Adrien Jules Jean Bonhoure, Governor (1902–1903)
Albert Dubarry, Acting Governor (1903)
Adrien Jules Jean Bonhoure, Governor (1903–1904)
Albert Dubarry, Acting Governor (1904)
Pierre Hubert Auguste Pascal, Governor (1904–1905)
Raphaël Antonetti, Acting Governor (1905)
Louis Ormiéres, Acting Governor (1905–1906)
Patte, Acting Governor (1906)
Pierre Hubert Auguste Pascal, Governor (1906–1908)
Jean-Baptiste Castaing, Acting Governor (1908–1909)
Pierre Hubert Auguste Pascal, Governor (1909–1911)
Jean-Baptiste Castaing, Acting Governor (1911)
Pierre Hubert Auguste Pascal, Governor (1911–1915)
Paul Simoni, Governor (1915–1916)
Victor Marie Fillon, Governor (1916–1918)
Jules Gérard Auguste Lauret, Governor (1918–1924)
Pierre Aimable Chapon-Baissac, Governor (1924–1932)
Louis Placide Blacher, Governor (1932–1934)
Jules Marcel de Coppet, Governor (1934–1935)
Achille Louis Auguste Silvestre, Governor (1935)
Armand Léon Annet, Governor (1935–1937)
Marie Francois Julien Pierre-Alype, Governor (1937–1938)
Hubert Jules Deschamps, Governor (1938–1940)
Gaetan Louis Elie Germain, Governor (1940)
Pierre Marie Elie Louis Nouailhetas, Governor (1940–1942)
Christian Raimond Dupont, Governor (1942)
Ange Marie Charles André Bayardelle, Governor (1942–1943)
Michel Raphael Antoine Saller, Governor (1943–1944)
Jean Victor Louis Joseph Chalvet, Governor (1944–1946)
Paul Henri Siriex, Governor (1946–1950)
Numa François Henri Sadoul, Governor (1950–1954)
Roland Joanes Louis Pré, Governor (1954)
René Petitbon, Governor (1954–1957)
Maurice Meker, Governor (1957–1958)
Jacques Marie Julien Compain, Governor (1958–1962)
René Tirant, Governor (1962–1966)
Louis Saget, Governor (1966–1967), High commissioner (1967–1969)

French Territory of the Afars and the Issas
High commissioners
Louis Saget, Governor (1966–1967), High commissioner (1967–1969)
Dominique Ponchardier, High commissioner (1969–1971)
Georges Thiercy, High commissioner (1971–1974)
Christian Dablanc, High commissioner (1974–1976)
Camille d'Ornano, High commissioner (1976–1977)
Presidents of the Government council
Ali Aref Bourhan, President (1967–1976)
Abdallah Mohamed Kamil, President (1976–1977)

Asia

French Indochina
Governors general
Paul Doumer, Governor general (1897–1902)

French India
Governors general
Adrien Jules Jean Bonhoure, Governor general (1908–1909)
Ernest Fernand Lévecque, Governor general (1909–1910)

Caribbean

Saint Barthélemy, overseas collectivity
Prefects: the prefect of Guadeloupe has been the representative of Saint Barthélemy since 2007
Jacques Billant, Prefect of Guadeloupe (2014–present)
Prefects-delegated of Saint Barthélemy and Saint Martin 
Presidents of the Territorial Council

Saint Martin, territorial collectivity
Prefects: the prefect of Guadeloupe has been the representative of Saint Martin since 2007
Jacques Billant, Prefect of Guadeloupe (2014–present)
Prefects-delegated of Saint Martin and Saint Martin 
Presidents of the Territorial Council

North America

Saint Pierre and Miquelon, overseas collectivity
Governors, Prefects
Jean-Jacques Buggia, Governor (1967–1971)
Pierre Eydoux, Prefect (1977–1979)
Clément Bouhin, Prefect (1979–1981)
Claude Guyon, Prefect (1981–1982)
Presidents of the General council
Albert Pen, President (1968–1984)

Oceania

French Comoros
High commissioners
Jacques Mouradian, High commissioner (1969–1975)
President of the Government council
Said Mohamed Cheikh, President (1962–1970)
Said Ibrahim Ben Ali, President (1970–1972)

French Polynesia, overseas collectivity
High commissioners
Michel Lucien Montagné, Governor (1933–1935)
Henri Sautot, Acting Governor (1935–1937)
Pierre Louis Angeli, High commissioner (1969–1973)
Paul Cousseran, High commissioner (1977–1981)
Paul Noirot-Cosson, High commissioner (1981–1983)
Jean Aribaud, High commissioner (1997–2001)
Presidents
Gaston Flosse, President (1984–1987)
Jacques Teuira, President (1987)
Alexandre Léontieff, President (1987–1991)
Gaston Flosse, President (1991–2004)

New Caledonia, special collectivity
Governors, High commissioners
Gabriel Ériau, Governor of New Caledonia (1974–1978)
Claude Charbonniaud, Governor (1978–1981)
Christian Nucci, High commissioner (1981–1982)
Presidents of the Government
Jean Lèques, President (1999–2001)

Wallis and Futuna, overseas collectivity
Administrators superior
Jean Léon Périé, administrator superior (1961–1962)
Jacques Emmanuel Victor Herry, administrator superior (1962–1962)
Jean Marie Pierre Bertrand, administrator superior (1962–1964)
André Pierre François Duc-Dufayard, administrator superior (1964–1966)
Fernand Lamodière, administrator superior (1966–1968)
Jacques Frédéric Gabriel Bach, administrator superior (1968–1971)
Guy Robert Boileau, administrator superior (1971–1972)
Jacques Ferrante de Agostini, administrator superior (1972–1974)
Yves Robert Émile Louis Arbellot-Repaire, administrator superior (1975–1976)
Henri Charles Beaux, administrator superior (1976–1979)
Pierre Jean Marc Isaac, administrator superior (1979–1980)
Robert Gilbert Georges Thil, administrator superior (1980–1983)
Michel Kuhnmunch, administrator superior (1984–1985)
Bernard Lesterlin, administrator superior (1985–1986)
Jacques Le Hénaff, administrator superior (1986–1987)
Gérard Lambotte, administrator superior (1987–1988)
Roger Dumec, administrator superior (1988–1990)
Robert Pommies, administrator superior (1990–1993)
Philippe Legrix, administrator superior (1993–1994)
Léon Alexandre Legrand, administrator superior (1994–1996)
Claude Pierret, administrator superior (1996–1998)
Christian Dors, administrator superior (1998–2000)
Alain Waquet, administrator superior (2000–2002)
Presidents of the Territorial assembly
Paino Tu'ugahala, President (1962–1967)
Sosefe Makapé Papillo, President (1967–1972)
Mikaele Folaumahina, President (1972–1975)
Soane Patita Lakina, President (1975–1977)
Pasilio Tui, President (1977–1978)
Manuele Lisahi, President (1978–1984)
Pasilio Tui, President (1984–1986)
Petelo Takatai, President (1986–1987)
Keleto Lakalala, President (1987)
Falakiko Gata, President (1987–1988)
Manuele Lisiahi, President (1988–1989)
Pasilio Tui, President (1989–1990)
Clovis Logologofolau, President (1990–1992)
Soane Mani Uhila, President (1992–1994)
Mikaele Tauhavili, President (1994–1996)
Keleto Lakalaka, President (1996–1997)
Victor Brial, President (1997–1999)
Soane Mani Uhila, President (1999–2001)
Kings of Uvea (Wallis)
Vito Lavelua II, King (1895–1904)
Lusiano Aisake, King (1904–1906)
Sosefo Mautāmakia I, King "Tokila" (1906–1910)
Soane-Patita Lavuia, King (1910–1916)
Sosefo Mautāmakia II, King (1916–1918)
Vitolo Kulihaapai, King (1918–1924)
Tomasi Kulimoetoke I, King (1924–1928)
Mikaele Tufele II, King (1928–1931)
Sosefo Mautāmakia I, King (1931–1933)
Petelo Kahofuna, King (1933)
Mikaele Tufele II, King (1933)
Council of Ministers (1933–1941)
Leone Mahikitoga, King (1941–1947)
Pelenato Fuluhea, King (1947–1950)
Kapeliele Tufele III, King (1950–1953)
Council of Ministers (1953)
Soane Toke, King (1953)
Aloisia Brial (née Tautuu), Queen (1953–1958)
Council of Ministers (1958–1959)
Tomasi Kulimoetoke II, King (1959–2007)
Kings of Alo
Soane Malia Musulamu, King (c.1887–1929)
Soane Moefana, King (1929–1932)
Tuiseka, King
Usanio Pipisega, King
Paloto Aika, King
Savelio Meitala, King
Kamilo Katea, King
Maleselino Maituku, King
Kolio Maituku, King
Papilio Tala'e, King
Lelipo Pipisega, King
Alesio Feta'u, King
Petelo Savo Meitala, King
Soane Va Pipisega, King
Silisio Katea, King
Petelo Tala'e, King
Vito Tuiseka, King
Petelo Maituku, King (?–1958)
Setefano Tuikalepa, King (1958–1960)
Kamaliele Moefana, King (1960–1961)
Pio Tagatamanogi, King (1961–1962)
Mikaele Fanene, King (1962–?)
Seteone Pipisega, King (?–1970)
Petelo Maituku, King (1970–1973)
Mikaele Katea, King (1973–1974)
Patita Savea, King (1974–1976)
Kalepo Nau, King (1977–1978)
Nopeleto Tuikalepa, King (1979–1984)
Petelo Lemo, King (1984–1990)
Lomano Musulamu, King (1990–1995)
Esipio Takasi, King (1995–1997)
Sagato Alofi, King (1997–2002)
Kings of Sigave
Mateo Tamole, King (19th/20th century)
Toviko Keletaona, King (19th/20th century)
Tamasi Tamole, King (early 20th century)
Toviko Keletaona, King (early 20th century)
Sui Tamole, King (early 20th century)
Ligareto Falemaa, King (?–1929)
Keletaona Keletaona, King (1929–1932)
Fololiano Sui Tamole, King (1932–1930s)
Sui Tamole, King (1930s)
Amole Keletaona, King (1941–1949)
Soane Vanai, King (1950s)
Pio Keletaona, King (?–1955)
Sakopo Tamole, Pausu (1955–1957)
Setefano Lavelua, King (1957–1959)
Sileno Tamole, Veu (1959–1969)
Alefosio Keletaona, Vasa (1969–1971)
Ilalio Amosala, King (1971–1972)
Nasalio Keletaona, King (1972–1982)
Sagato Keletaona, King (1982–1987)
Sosefo Vanai, King (1987–1990)
Lafaele Malau, King (1990–1994)
Soane Patita Sokotaua, King (1994–1997)
Pasilio Keletaona, King (1997–2003)

Iraq
President: Saddam Hussein
Republic of Kuwait Established 4 August 1990. Annexed by Iraq 28 August 1990 – 26 February 1991.
Head of State (Rais al-Wuzara) 
Alaa Hussein Ali (Alaa Hussein Ali Al Khafaji Al Jabir), Prime Minister of the Republic of Kuwait (2 Aug 1990–8 Aug 1990)
Iraqi Governors 
Colonel general Ali Hassan al-Majid "Chemical Ali", Governor of 19th Province (8 Aug 1990 – Nov 1990)
Aziz Salih Numan, Governor of 19th Province (Nov 1990–26 Feb 1991)

Japan
Empire of Japan Japanese colonial empire
Monarchs
Prime ministers

Karafuto Prefecture
Governors general
Suzuki Yonosuke, Proconsul (1905)
Kiichirō Kumagai, Governor general (1905–1907)
Kusunose Yukihiko, Governor general (1907–1908)
Tokonami Takejirō, Governor general (1908–1908)
Sadatarō Hiraoka, Governor general (1908–1914)
Bunji Okada, Governor general (1914–1916)
Akira Masaya, Governor general (1916–1919)
Kinjirō Nagai, Governor general (1919–1924)
Akira Masaya, Governor general (1924–1926)
Katsuzō Toyota, Governor general (1926–1927)
Kōji Kita, Governor general (1927–1929)
Shinobu Agata, Governor general (1929–1931)
Masao Kishimoto, Governor general (1931–1932)
Takeshi Imamura, Governor general (1932–1938)
Toshikazu Munei, Governor general (1938–1940)
Masayoshi Ogawa, Governor general (1940–1943)
Toshio Ōtsu, Governor general (1943–1947)

Japanese Korea
Governors general
Itō Hirobumi, Resident general (1905–1909)
Sone Arasuke, Resident general (1909)
Terauchi Masatake, Resident general (1909–1910), Governor general (1910–1916)
Hasegawa Yoshimichi, Governor general (1916–1919)
Saitō Makoto, Governor general (1919–1927)
Kazushige Ugaki, Governor general (1927)
Yamanashi Hanzō, Governor general (1927–1929)
Saitō Makoto, Governor general (1929–1931)
Kazushige Ugaki, Governor general (1931–1936)
Jirō Minami, Governor general (1936–1942)
Kuniaki Koiso, Governor general (1942–1944)
Nobuyuki Abe, Governor general (1944–1945)

Japanese Taiwan
Governors general
Kodama Gentarō Governor general (1898–1906)
Sakuma Samata Governor general (1906–1915)
Andō Sadami Governor general (1915–1916)
Akashi Motojirō Governor general (1916–1917)
Den Kenjirō Governor general (1919–1923)
Uchida Kakichi Governor general (1923–1924)
Takio Izawa, Governor general (1924–1926)
Kamiyama Mitsunoshin, Governor general (1926–1928)
Kawamura Takeji, Governor general (1928–1929)
Ishizuka Eizō, Governor general (1929–1931)
Ōta Masahiro, Governor general (1931–1932)
Hiroshi Minami, Governor general (1932)
Nakagawa Kenzō Governor general (1932–1936)
Seizō Kobayashi Governor general (1936–1940)
Kiyoshi Hasegawa Governor general (1940–1944)
Rikichi Ando Governor general (1944–1945)

Netherlands
Kingdom of the Netherlands Dutch colonial empire
Monarchs
Prime ministers

Asia

Dutch East Indies
Governors general, High commissioners
Willem Rooseboom, Governors general (1899–1904)
J. B. van Heutsz, Governors general (1904–1909)
Alexander Willem Frederik Idenburg, Governors general (1909–1916)
Johan Paul van Limburg Stirum, Governors general (1916–1921)
Dirk Fock, Governors general (1921–1926)
Andries Cornelis Dirk de Graeff, Governors general (1926–1931)
Bonifacius Cornelis de Jonge, Governors general (1931–1936)
Tjarda van Starkenborgh Stachouwer, Governors general (1936–1942)
Hubertus van Mook, Governors general (1942–1948)
Louis Beel, High commissioner (1948–1949)
Tony Lovink, High commissioner (1949)

Caribbean

Aruba, autonomous territory
Governors
Felipe Tromp, Governor (1986–1992)
Olindo Koolman, Governor (1992–2004)
Prime ministers
Henny Eman, Prime minister (1986–1989)
Nelson Oduber, Prime minister (1989–1994)
Henny Eman, Prime minister (1994–2001)

New Zealand
New Zealand
Monarchs
Prime ministers

Cook Islands, state in free association
High commissioners
Leslie James Davis, High commissioner (1965–1972)
Queen's Representatives
Gaven Donne, Queen's representative (1982–1984)
Graham Speight, Acting Queen's representative (1984)
Tangaroa Tangaroa, Queen's representative (1984–1990)
Apenera Short, Queen's representative (1990–2000)
Lawrence Murray Greig, Acting Queen's representative (2000–2001)
Prime ministers
Albert Henry, Prime minister (1965–1978)
Tom Davis, Prime minister (1978–1983)
Geoffrey Henry, Prime minister (1983)
Tom Davis, Prime minister (1983–1987)
Pupuke Robati, Prime minister (1987–1989)
Geoffrey Henry, Prime minister (1989–1999)
Joe Williams, Prime minister (1999)
Terepai Maoate, Prime minister (1999–2002)

Niue, associated state
Commissioners
Selwyn Digby Wilson, Resident commissioner (1968–197?)
Representatives
Terry Baker, New Zealand Representative (1979–1982)
Premiers
Robert Rex, Premier (1974–1992)
Young Vivian, Premier (1992–1993)
Frank Lui, Premier (1993–1999)
Sani Lakatani, Premier (1999–2002)

Tokelau, territory
Administrators
George Spafford Richardson, administrator (1926–1928)
Stephen Allen, administrator (1928–1931)
Herbert Ernest Hart, administrator (1931–1935)
Alfred Turnbull, administrator (1935–1946)
Francis Voelcker, administrator (1946–1949)
Guy Powles, administrator (1949–1960)
John Wright, administrator (1960–1965)
Paul Gabites, administrator (1965–1968)
Richard Taylor, administrator (1968–1971)
Duncan MacIntyre, administrator (1971–1972)
Matiu Rata, administrator (1972–1973)
Gray Thorp, administrator (1973–1975)
Frank Henry Corner, administrator (1975–1984)
Harold Huyton Francis, administrator (1984–1988)
Neil Walter, administrator (1988–1990)
Graham Keith Ansell, administrator (1990–1992)
Brian Absolum, administrator (1992–1993)
Lindsay Johnstone Watt, administrator (1993–2003)
Heads of government
Lepaio Simi, Head of government (1992–1993)
Salesio Lui, Head of government (1993–1994)
Kerisiano Neemia, Head of government (1994–1995)
Kuresa Nasau, Head of government (1995–1996)
Pio Tuia, Head of government (1996–1997)
Falima Teao, Head of government (1997–1998)
Kuresa Nasau, Head of government (1998–1999)
Pio Tuia, Head of government (1999–2000)
Kolouei O'Brien, Head of government (2000–2001)

Norway
Norway
Monarchs
Prime ministers

Svalbard, territory
Governors
Johannes Gerckens Bassøe, Governor (1925–1933)
Helge Ingstad, Acting Governor (1933–1935)
Wolmar Tycho Marlow, Governor (1935–1941)
Håkon Balstad, Governor (1945–1956)
Odd Birketvedt, Governor (1956–1960)
Finn Backer Midtbøe, Governor (1960–1963)
Tollef Landsverk, Governor (1963–1967)
Stephen Stephensen, Governor (1967–1970)
Fredrik Beichmann, Governor (1970–1974)
Leif Eldring, Governor (1974–1978)
Jan Grøndahl, Governor (1978–1982)
Carl Alexander Wendt, Governor (1982–1985)
Leif Eldring, Governor (1985–1991)
Odd Blomdal, Governor (1991–1995)
Ann-Kristin Olsen, Governor (1995–1998)
Morten Ruud, Governor (1998–2001)

Portugal
Kingdom of Portugal, First Portuguese Republic, Ditadura Nacional, Second Portuguese Republic, Third Portuguese Republic Portuguese colonial empire
Monarchs
Presidents
Prime ministers

Africa

Portuguese Angola
Governors general, High commissioners
Francisco Xavier Cabral de Oliveira Moncada, Governor general (1900–1903)
Eduardo Augusto Ferreira da Costa, Governor general (1903–1904)
Custódio Miguel de Borja, Governor general (1904)
António Duarte Ramada Curto, Governor general (1904–1905)
Caminho de Ferro de Mossámedes, Governor general (1905–1906)
Eduardo Augusto Ferreira da Costa, Governor general (1906–1907)
Henrique Mitchell de Paiva, Governor general (1907–1909)
Álvaro António da Costa Ferreira, Governor general (1909)
José Augusto Alves Roçadas, Governor general (1909–1910)
Caetano Francisco Cláudio Eugénio Gonçalves, Governor general (1910–1911)
Manuel Maria Coelho, Governor general (1911–1912)
José Mendes Ribeiro Norton de Matos, Governor general (1912–1915)
António Júlio da Costa Pereira de Eça, Governor general (1915–1916)
Pedro Francisco Massano do Amorim, Governor general (1916–1917)
Jaime Alberto de Castro Morais, Governor general (1917–1918)
Filomeno da Câmara Melo Cabral, Governor general (1918–1919)
Mimoso Guera, Governor general (1919–1920)
Visconde de Pedralva, Governor general (1920–1921)
João Mendes Ribeiro Norton de Matos, High commissioner (1921–1924)
João Augusto Crispiniano Soares, High commissioner (1924)
Antero Tavares de Carvalho, High commissioner (1924–1925)
Francisco Cunha Rêgo Cháves, High commissioner (1925–1926)
António Vicente Ferreira, High commissioner (1926–1928)
António Damas Mora, High commissioner (1928–1929)
Filomeno da Câmara Melo Cabral, High commissioner (1929–1930)
José Dionísio Carneiro de Sousa e Faro, High commissioner (1930–1931)
Eduardo Ferreira Viana, High commissioner (1931–1934)
Júlio Garcês de Lencastre, High commissioner (1934–1935)
António Lopes Matheus, High commissioner (1935–1939)
Manoel da Cunha e Costa Marquês Mano, High commissioner (1939–1941)
Abel de Abreu Souto-Maior, High commissioner (1941–1942)
Álvaro de Freitas Morna, High commissioner (1942–1943)
Manuel Pereira Figueira, High commissioner (1943)
Vasco Lopes Alves, High commissioner (1943–1947)
Fernando Falcão Pacheco Mena, High commissioner (1947)
José Agapito de Silva Carvalho, High commissioner (1948–1955)
Manoel de Gusmão Mascarenhas Gaivão, High commissioner (1955–1956)
Horácio José de Sá Viana Rebelo, High commissioner (1956–1960)
Álvaro Rodrigues da Silva Tavares, High commissioner (1960–1961)
Verâncio Augusto Deslandes, High commissioner (1961–1962)
Silvino Silvério Marquês, High commissioner (1962–1966)
Camilo Augusto de Miranda Rebocho Vaz, High commissioner (1966–1972)
Fernando Augusto Santos e Castro, High commissioner (1972–1974)
Joaquín Franco Pinheiro, High commissioner (1974)
Silvino Silvério Marquês, High commissioner (1974)
António Alva Rosa Coutinho, High commissioner (1974–1975)
Ernesto Ferreira de Macedo, High commissioner (1975)
Leonel Silva Cardoso, High commissioner (1975)

Portuguese Cape Verde
Governors
Arnaldo de Novalis Guedes de Rebelo, Governor (1901–1902)
Francisco de Paula Cid, Governor (1902–1903)
António Alfredo Barjona de Freitas, Governor (1903–1904)
Amâncio Alpoim de Cerqueira Borges Cabral, Governor (1905–1907)
Bernardo António da Costa de Macedo, Governor (1907–1909)
Martinho Pinto de Queirós Montenegro, Governor (1909–1910)
António de Macedo Ramalho Ortigão, Governor (1910–1911)
Artur Marinha de Campos, Governor (1911–1911)
Joaquím Pedro Vieira Índice Bicker, Governor (1911–1915)
Abel Fontoura da Costa, Governor (1915–1918)
Teófilo Duarte, Governor (1918–1919)
Manuel Firmino de Almeida da Maia Magalhães, Governor (1919–1921)
Filipe Carlos Dias de Carvalho, Governor (1921–1922)
Júlio Henriques d'Abreu, Governor (1924–1926)
João de Almeida, Governor (1927–1927)
António Álvares Guedes Vaz, Governor (1927–1931)
Amadeu Gomes de Figueiredo, Governor (1931–1941)
José Diogo Ferreira Martins, Governor (1941–1943)
João de Figueiredo, Governor (1943–1949)
Carlos Alberto Garcia Alves Roçadas, Governor (1950–1953)
Manuel Marques de Abrantes Amaral, Governor (1953–1957)
António Augusto Peixoto Correia, Acting Governor (1957–1958)
Silvino Silvério Marques, Governor (1958–1962)
Leão Maria Tavares Rosado do Sacramento Monteiro, Governor (1963–1969)
António Lopes dos Santos, Governor (1969–1974)
Henrique da Silva Horta, Governor (1974)
Vicente Almeida d'Eça, Governor (1974), High Commissioner (1974–1975)

Portuguese Guinea
Governors
António de Spínola, Governor (1968–1973)

Portuguese Mozambique
High commissioners and Governors general
Manuel Rafael Gorjão, Governor general (1900–1902)
Tomás António Garcia Rosado, Governor general (1902–1905)
João António de Azevedo Coutinho Fragoso de Sequeira, Governor general (1905–1906)
Alfredo Augusto Freire de Andrade, Governor general (1906–1910)
José de Freitas Ribeiro, Acting Governor general (1910–1911)
José Francisco de Azevedo e Silva, Governor general (1911–1912)
Alfredo Afonso Meneses de Magalhães, Governor general (1912–1913)
Augusto Ferreira dos Santos, Governor general (1913–1914)
Joaquim José Machado, Governor general (1914–1915)
Alfredo Baptista Coelho, Governor general (1915)
Álvaro Xavier de Castro, Governor general (1915–1918)
Pedro Francisco Massano do Amorim, Governor general (1918–1919)
Manuel Juiz Moreira da Fonseca, Acting Governor general (1919–1921)
Manuel de Brito Camacho, High commissioner and Governor general (1921–1923)
Manuel Juiz Moreira da Fonseca, Acting High commissioner and Governor general (1923–1924)
Víctor Hugo de Azevedo Coutinho, High commissioner and Governor general (1924–1926)
Artur Ivens Ferraz, Acting High commissioner and Governor general (1926)
José Ricardo Pereira Cabral, High commissioner and Governor general (1926–1938)
José Nicolau Nunes de Oliveira, High commissioner and Governor general (1938–1941)
João Tristão de Bettencourt, High commissioner and Governor general (1941–1946)
Luís de Sousa e Vasconcelos e Funchal, High commissioner and Governor general (1947–1948)
Gabriel Mauricio Teixeira, High commissioner and Governor general (1948–1951)
Overseas Province of Portugal
Gabriel Maurício Teixeira, High commissioner and Governor general (1951–1958)
Pedro Correia de Barros, High commissioner and Governor general (1958–1961)
Manuel Maria Sarmento Rodrigues, High commissioner and Governor general (1961–1964)
José Augusto da Costa Almeida, High commissioner and Governor general (1964–1968)
Baltazar Rebelo de Sousa, High commissioner and Governor general (1968–1970)
Eduardo Arantes e Oliveira, High commissioner and Governor general (1970–1972)
Manuel Pimentel Pereira dos Santos, High commissioner and Governor general (1972–1974)
David Teixeira Ferreira, Acting High commissioner and Governor general (1974)
Henrique Soares de Melo, High commissioner and Governor general (1974)
Jorge Ferro Ribeiro, Acting High commissioner and Governor general (1974)
Vítor Crespo, High commissioner and Governor general (1974)
local administration
Vítor Crespo, High commissioner and Governor general (1974–1975)

Portuguese São Tomé and Príncipe
Governors
Crown colony
Amâncio de Alpoim Cerqueira Borges Cabral, Governor (1899–1901)
Francisco Maria Peixoto Vieira, Acting Governor (1901)
Joaquim Xavier de Brito, Governor (1901–1902)
João Abel Antunes Mesquita Guimarães, Governor (1902–1903)
João Gregório Duarte Ferreira, Acting Governor (1903)
Francisco de Paula Cid, Governor (1903–1907)
Vitor Augusto Chaves Lemos e Melo, Acting Governor (1907)
Pedro Berquó, Governor (1907–1908)
Vítor Augusto Chaves Lemos e Mel, Acting Governor (1908–1909)
José Augusto Vieira da Fonseca, Governor (1909–1910)
Jaime Daniel Leote do Rego, Governor (1910)
Fernando Augusto de Carvalho, Governor (1910)
Carlos de Mendonça Pimentel e Melo, Acting Governor (1910)
António Pinto Miranda Guedes, Governor (1910–1911)
Jaime Daniel Leote do Rego, Governor (1911)
Mariano Martins, Governor (1911–1913)
Pedro do Amaral Boto Machado, Governor (1913–1915)
José Dionísio Carneiro de Sousa e Faro, Governor (1915)
Rafael dos Santos Oliveira, Acting Governor (1915–1918)
João Gregório Duarte Ferreira, Governor (1918–1919)
Avelino Augusto de Oliveira Leite, Governor (1919–1920)
José Augusto de Conceição Alves Vélez, Acting Governor (1920)
Eduardo Nogueira de Lemos, Acting Governor (1920–1921)
António José Pereira, Governor (1921–1924)
Eugénio de Barros Soares Branco, Governor (1924–1926)
José Duarte Junqueira Rato, Governor (1926–1928)
Sebastião José Barbosa, Acting Governor (1928–1929)
Francisco Penteado, Governor (1929)
Luís Augusto Vieira Fernandes, Governor (1929–1933)
Ricardo Vaz Monteiro, Governor (1933–1941)
Amadeu Gomes de Figueiredo, Governor (1941–1945)
Carlos de Sousa Gorgulho, Governor (1945–1948)
Afonso Manuel Machado de Sousa, Acting Governor (1948–1950)
Mário José Cabral Oliveira Castro, Acting Governor (1950–1951)
Overseas province
Mário José Cabral Oliveira Castro, Acting Governor (1951–1952)
Guilherme António Amaral Abranches Pinto, Acting Governor (1952–1953)
Fernando Augusto Rodrigues, Acting Governor (1953)
Afonso Manuel Machado de Sousa, Acting Governor (1953)
Francisco António Pires Barata, Governor (1953–1954)
Luís da Câmara Leme Faria, Acting Governor (1954–1955)
José Machado, Acting Governor (1955–1956)
Octávio Ferreira Gonçalves, Acting Governor (1956–1957)
Manuel Marques de Abrantes Amaral, Governor (1957–1963)
Alberto Monteiro de Sousa Campos, Acting Governor (1963)
António Jorge da Silva Sebastião, Governor (1963–1972)
João Cecilio Gonçalves, Governor (1973–1974)
António Elísio Capelo Pires Veloso, Governor (1974)
Autonomous province
António Elísio Capelo Pires Veloso, High Commissioner (1974–1975)

Asia

Portuguese Macau
Governors
José Garcia Leandro, Governor (1974–1979)
Melo Egídio, Governor (1979–1981)
José Carlos Moreira Campos, Acting Governor (1981)
Vasco de Almeida e Costa, Governor (1981–1986)

Oceania

Azores, autonomous region
Representatives of the Portuguese Republic
Presidents of the Government
João Bosco Mota Amaral, President (1976–1995)
Alberto Madruga da Costa, President (1995–1996)
Carlos César, President (1996–2012)

Portuguese Timor
Governors
José Nogueira Valente Pires, Governor (1968–1972)

South Africa
Union of South Africa, Republic of South Africa
Heads of state
Prime ministers

South West Africa
Administrators
Johannes Gert Hendrik van der Wath, administrator (1968–1971)
Marthinus T. Steyn, administrator general (1977–1979)
Gerrit Viljoen, administrator general (1979–1980)
Danie Hough, administrator general (1980–1983)

United Kingdom
United Kingdom of Great Britain and Ireland, United Kingdom of Great Britain and Northern Ireland British colonial empire
Monarchs
Prime ministers

Africa

Basutoland
Paramount chiefs
Nathaniel Griffith Lerotholi, Paramount chief (1913–1939)
High commissioners
Herbert John Gladstone High commissioner for Southern Africa (1910–1914)
Sydney Buxton High commissioner for Southern Africa (1914–1920)
Resident commissioners
Herbert Sloley, Resident commissioner (1902–1916)

Barotziland-North-Western Rhodesia		
Robert Thorne Coryndon, administrator (1897–1907)	
Hugh Hole, administrator (1907)	
John Carden, acting administrator (1907–1908)	
Robert Edward Codrington, administrator (1908)
Lawrence Aubrey Wallace, administrator (1909–1911)	
			
Bechuanaland
High Commissioner for Southern Africa
Herbert Gladstone, High commissioner (1910–1914)
Resident commissioners
Francis William Panzera, Resident Commissioner (1906–1916)
Charles Fernand Rey, Resident commissioner (1930–1937)
Charles Noble Arden-Clarke, Resident commissioner (1937–1942)
High commissioners
Herbert John Gladstone High commissioner for Southern Africa (1910–1914)
Sydney Buxton High commissioner for Southern Africa (1914–1920)

East Africa Protectorate
Governors
James Hayes Sadler, Governor (1905–1909)
Henry Conway Belfield, Governor (1912–1917)

Khedivate of Egypt, occupied territory 
British agents
Herbert Kitchener, British Consul general (1911–1914)
Milne Cheetham, Acting High commissioner (1914–1915)
Khedives
Abbas Helmy Pasha, Khedive (1892–1914)
Hussein Kamel, Khedive/Sultan (1914–1917)
Prime ministers
Mohamed Said Pasha, Prime minister (1910–1914)
Hussein Roshdy Pasha, Prime minister (1914–1919)

The Gambia
Governors
Henry Lionel Galway, Governor (1911–1914)
Edward John Cameron, Governor (1914–1920)

Gold Coast
Governors
Hugh Charles Clifford, Governor (1912–1919)

British Kenya
Governors
Joseph Aloysius Byrne, Governor (1931–1936)
Armigel de Vins Wade, Governor (1936–1937)
Robert Brooke-Popham, Governor (1937–1939)

Nigeria
Governors
Bernard Henry Bourdillon, Governor (1935–1940)

Nyasaland
Governors
George Smith, Governor (1913–1923)
Harold Baxter Kittermaster, Governor (1934–1939)

North-Eastern Rhodesia 
Robert Edward Codrington, administrator (1898–1907)
Lawrence Aubrey Wallace, administrator (1907–1909)
Leicester Paul Beaufort, administrator (1909–1911)
Hugh Charlie Marshall, acting administrator (1911)

Northern Rhodesia
Governors
Hugh Charlie Marshall, acting administrator (1911)
Lawrence Aubrey Wallace, administrator (1911–1921)
Francis Chaplin, administrator (1921–1923)
Richard Goode, acting administrator (1923–1924)	
Herbert Stanley, Governor (1924–1927)
Richard Goode, acting Governor (1927)
James Crawford Maxwell, Governor (1927–1932)
Ronald Storrs, Governor (1932–1935)	
Hubert Winthrop Young, Governor (1935–1938)							
John Alexander Maybin, Governor (1938–1941)
William Marston Logan, Acting Governor (1941)
Eubule John Waddington, Governor (1941–1947)
Robert Stanley, acting Governor (1947–1948)	
Gilbert McCall Rennie, Governor (1948–1954)	
Alexander Thomas Williams, acting Governor (1954)
Arthur Benson, Governor (1954–1959)				
Evelyn Dennison Hone, Governor (1959–1964)
Prime ministers
Kenneth Kaunda, Prime minister (1964)

Southern Rhodesia
Governors
Fraser Russell, Governor (1934–1935)
Herbert Stanley, Governor (1935–1942)
Christopher Soames, Governor (1979–1980)

Anglo-Egyptian Sudan
Governors
Knox Helm, Governor general (1954–1955)

Uganda Protectorate
Governors
Bernard Henry Bourdillon, Governor (1932–1935)
Philip Euen Mitchell, Governor (1935–1940)

Asia

Aden Colony
Governors
Bernard Rawdon Reilly, Governor (1937–1940)
John Hathorn Hall, Governor (1940–1945)
Reginald Champion, Governor (1945–1950)
William Goode, acting Governor (1950–1951)
Tom Hickinbotham, Governor (1951–1956)
William Luce, Governor (1956–1960)	
Charles Johnston, Governor (1960–1963)

Federation of South Arabia
High commissioners
Charles Johnston, High commissioner (1963)
Kennedy Trevaskis, High commissioner (1963–1964)
Richard Turnbull, High commissioner (1964–1967)	
Humphrey Trevelyan, High commissioner (1967)
Chief ministers
Hassan Ali Bayumi, Chief minister (1963)
Zayn Abdu Baharun, Chief minister (1963–1965)
Abdel-Qawi Hasan Makkawi, Chief minister (1965)
Ali Musa al-Babakr, Chief minister (1965–1966)
Salih al-Awadli, Chief minister (1966–1967)

Bahrain Protectorate
Native monarchs
`Isa ibn Ali Al Khalifah, Hakim (1869–1932)
Sheikh Isa ibn Salman Al Khalifah, Hakim (1961–1999)
Prime ministers
Khalifah ibn Sulman Al Khalifah, President of the State council (1970–present)
Chief political residents of the Persian Gulf
Stewart Crawford, Chief political resident (1966–1970)
Geoffrey Arthur, Chief political resident (1970–1971)
British political agents
Arthur Prescott Trevor, British political agent (1912–1914)
Terence Humphrey Keyes, British political agent (1914–1916)
British political agents
Alexander John Stirling, British political agent (1969–1971)

Brunei Protectorate
Administrators
Francis William Douglas, Resident Administrator (1913–1915)
Arthur Robin Adair, High commissioner (1968–1972)
James Alfred Davidson, High commissioner (1975–1978)
Arthur Christopher Watson, High commissioner (1978–1984)
Sultans
Muhammad Jamalul Alam, Sultan (1906–1924)
Hassanal Bolkiah, Sultan (1967–present)
Chief ministers
Yura Halim, Chief minister (1967–1972)
Pengiran Dipa Negara Laila Diraja Pengiran Abdul Mumin, Chief minister (1972–1981)
Pehin Orang Kaya Laila Wijaya Dato Haji Abdul Aziz Umar, Chief minister (1981–1983)

British Ceylon
Governors
Reginald Edward Stubbs, Governor (1933–1937)
Andrew Caldecott, Governor (1937–1944)

British Hong Kong
Francis Henry May, Governor (1912–1919)
William Peel, Governor (1930–1935)
Andrew Caldecott, Governor (1935–1937)
Geoffry Northcote, Governor (1937–1941)
David Clive Crosbie Trench, Governor (1964–1971)
MacLehose of Beoch, Governor (1971–1982)
Hugh Norman-Walker, Acting Governor (1971)					
Murray MacLehose, Governor (1971–1982)

British India
Viceroy of India
Charles Hardinge, Viceroy and Governor general (1910–1916)
Freeman Freeman-Thomas, Viceroy and Governor general (1931–1936)
Victor Hope, Viceroy and Governor general (1936–1943)

Kuwait, British protectorate
Emirs
Mubarak al-Lahab Al Sabah, Emir (1896–1915)
British political agents
William Henry Irvine Shakespear, British political agent (1909–1914)
William George Grey, British political agent (1914–1916)

Qatar
British political agents
Edward Henderson, British political agent (1969–1971)
Monarchs
Sheikh Ahmad bin Ali Al Thani, Hakim (1960–1972)
Prime ministers
Sheikh Khalifa bin Hamad Al Thani, Prime minister (1970–1995)

Straits Settlement
John Anderson, Governor (1904–1911)
Shenton Thomas, Governor (1934–1942)

Trucial States, Protectorate
British political agents
Julian Bullard, British political agent (1968–1970)

British Isles
Guernsey, Crown dependency
British monarchs are the Dukes of Normandy
Lieutenant governors
Michael Saward, Lieutenant governor (1899–1903)
Barrington Campbell, Lieutenant governor (1903–1908)
Robert Auld, Lieutenant governor (1908–1911)
Edward Hamilton, Lieutenant governor (1911–1914)
Henry Merrick Lawson, Lieutenant governor (1914)
Reginald Clare Hart, Lieutenant governor (1914–1918)
Launcelot Kiggell, Lieutenant governor (1918–1920)
John Capper, Lieutenant governor (1920–1925)
Charles Sackville-West, Lieutenant governor (1925–1929)
Walter Hore-Ruthven, Lieutenant governor (1929–1934)
Edward Broadbent, Lieutenant governor (1934–1939)
Alexander Telfer-Smollett, Lieutenant governor (1939–1940)
John Minshull-Ford, Lieutenant governor (1940)
'German occupation of the Channel Islands (1940–1945)
Charles Gage Stuart, Lieutenant governor (1945)
Philip Neame, Lieutenant governor (1945–1953)
Thomas Elmhirst, Lieutenant governor (1953–1958)
Geoffrey Robson, Lieutenant governor (1958–1964)
Charles Coleman, Lieutenant governor (1964–1969)
Charles Mills, Lieutenant governor (1969–1974)
John Martin, Lieutenant governor (1974–1980)
Peter Le Cheminant, Lieutenant governor (1980–1985)
Alexander Boswell, Lieutenant governor (1985–1990)
Michael Wilkins, Lieutenant governor (1990–1994)
John Coward, Lieutenant governor (1994–2000)
John Paul Foley, Lieutenant governor (2000–2005)
Bailiffs
Thomas Godfrey Carey, Bailiff (1895–1902)
Henry Alexander Giffard, Bailiff (1902–1908)
William Carey, Bailiff (1908–1915)
Edward Chepmell Ozanne, Bailiff (1915–1922)
Havilland Walter de Sausmarez, Bailiff (1922–1929)
Arthur William Bell, Bailiff (1929–1935)
Victor Carey, Bailiff (1935–1946)
Ambrose Sherwill, Bailiff (1946–1959)
William Arnold, Bailiff (1959–1973)
John Loveridge, Bailiff (1973–1982)
Charles Frossard, Bailiff (1982–1992)
Graham Martyn Dorey, Bailiff (1992–1999)
de Vic Carey, Bailiff (1999–2005)

Alderney, self-governing island of Guernsey
Presidents of the states
Sydney Peck Herivel, President of the states (1949–1970)
George William Baron, President of the states (1970–1977)
Jon Kay-Mouat, President of the states (1977–1994)
George William Baron, President of the states (1994–1997)
Jon Kay-Mouat, President of the states (1997–2002)

Sark, self-governing island of Guernsey
Seigneurs
William Frederick Collings, Seigneur (1882–1927)
Sibyl Hathaway, Seigneur (1927–1974)
Robert Hathaway, Seigneur (1929–1954)

Jersey, Crown dependency
British monarchs are the Dukes of Normandy
Lieutenant governors
Alexander Nelson Rochefort, Lieutenant governor (1910–1916)
John Gilbert Davi, Lieutenant governor (1969–1974)
Desmond Fitzpatrick, Lieutenant governor (1974–1979)
Peter Whiteley, Lieutenant governor (1979–1985)
Michael Wilkes, Lieutenant governor (1995–2001)
Bailiffs
William Henry Venables-Vernon, Bailiff (1899–1931)
Robert Hugh Le Masurier, Bailiff (1962–1974)
Frank Ereaut, Bailiff (1975–1985)
Philip Bailhache, Bailiff (1995–2009)

Isle of Man, Crown dependency
British monarchs are the Lords of Mann
Lieutenant governors
George Somerset, Lieutenant governor (1902–1918)
Peter Stallard, Lieutenant governor (1966–1974)
John Warburton Paul, Lieutenant governor (1974–1980)
Nigel Cecil, Lieutenant governor (1980–1985)
Ian Macfadyen, Lieutenant governor (2000–2005)
Chairmen of the Executive council
Norman Crowe, Chairman of the Executive council (1967–1971)
Clifford Irving, Chairman of the Executive council (1977–1981)
Percy Radcliffe, Chairman of the Executive council (1981–1985)
Chief ministers
Miles Walker, Chief minister (1986–1996)
Donald Gelling, Chief minister 1996–2001)

Northern Ireland, part of the United Kingdom of Great Britain and Northern Ireland (from 1922); subject to direct rule 1972–98
British monarchs are the Monarchs of Northern Ireland
Governor of Northern Ireland
 James Hamilton, 3rd Duke of Abercorn (1922–45)
 William Leveson-Gower, 4th Earl Granville (1945–52)
 John Loder, 2nd Baron Wakehurst (1952–64)
 John Erskine, 1st Baron Erskine of Rerrick (1964–68)
 Ralph Grey, Baron Grey of Naunton (1968–72)
Secretary of State for Northern Ireland
 Willie Whitelaw (1972–73)
 Francis Pym (1973–74)
 Merlyn Rees (1974–76)
 Roy Mason (1976–79)
 Humphrey Atkins (1979–81)
 Jim Prior (1981–84)
 Douglas Hurd (1984–85)
 Tom King (1985–89)
 Peter Brooke (1989–92)
 Patrick Mayhew (1992–97)
 Mo Mowlam (1997–99)
 Peter Mandelson (1999–2001)

Caribbean and Central America

Anguilla, overseas territory
Governors
Charles Henry Godden, Governor (1982–1983)
Alastair Turner Baillie, Governor (1983–1987)
Geoffrey Owen Whittaker, Governor (1987–1989)
Brian George John Canty, Governor (1989–1992)
Alan W. Shave, Governor (1992–1995)
Alan Hoole, Governor (1995–1996)
Robert Harris, Governor (1996–2000)
Roger Cousins, Acting Governor (2000)
Peter Johnstone, Governor (2000–2004)
Chief ministers
Ronald Webster, Chief minister (1976–1977)
Emile Gumbs, Chief minister (1977–1980)
Ronald Webster, Chief minister (1980–1984)
Emile Gumbs, Chief minister (1984–1994)
Hubert Hughes, Chief minister (1994–2000)
Osbourne Fleming, Chief minister (2000–2010)

Antigua and Barbuda
Governors
Wilfred Jacobs, Governor (1967–1993), Governor (1967–1981)
Chief ministers
Vere Bird, Chief minister (1960–1967), Premier (1967–1971)
Vere Bird, Premier (1976–1994)

The Bahama Islands
Governors
Gilbert Thomas Carter, Governor (1898–1904)
William Grey-Wilson, Governor (1904–1912)
George Haddon-Smith, Governor (1912–1914)
William Allardyce, Governor (1914–1920)
Harry Edward Spiller Cordeaux, Governor (1920–1926)
Charles William James Orr, Governor (1927–1932)
Bede Edmund Hugh Clifford, Governor (1932–1934)
Charles Dundas, Governor (1934–1940)
Edward VIII, Governor (1940–1945)
William Lindsay Murphy, Governor (1945–1950)
George Ritchie Sandford, Governor (1950)
Robert Arthur Ross Neville, Governor (1950–1953)
Daniel Knox, Governor (1953–1956)
Oswald Raynor Arthur, Governor (1957–1960)
Robert Stapeldon, Governor (1960–1964)
Ralph Grey, Baron Grey of Naunton, Governor (1964–1968)
Francis Hovell-Thurlow-Cumming-Bruce, Governor (1968–1972)
Prime ministers
Lynden Pindling, Premier (1967–1992), Premier (1967–1969), Prime minister (1969–1973)

Colony of Barbados
Governors
Frederick Mitchell Hodgson, Governor (1900–1904)
Gilbert Thomas Carter, Governor (1904–1911)
Leslie Probyn, Governor (1911–1918)
Charles Richard Mackey O'Brien, Governor (1918–1925)
William Charles Fleming Robertson, Governor (1925–1933)
Harry Scott Newlands, Governor (1933)
Mark Aitchison Young, Governor (1933–1938)
Eubule John Waddington, Governor (1938–1941)
Henry Grattan Bushe, Governor (1941–1947)
Hilary Rudolph Robert Blood, Governor (1947–1949)
Alfred Savage, Governor (1949–1953)
Robert Arundell, Governor (1953–1959)
John Montague Stow, Governor (1959–1966)

British Honduras / Belize
Governors
Wilfred Collet, Governor (1913–1918)
John Warburton Paul, Governor (1966–1972)
Peter Donovan McEntee, Governor (1976–1980)
James Hennessy, Governor (1980–1981)
Premiers
George Cadle Price, Premier (1964–1981)

Cayman Islands, overseas territory
Commissioners, administrators, Governors
Frederick Shedden Sanguinnetti, Commissioner (1898–1907)
George Stephenson Hirst, Commissioner (1907–1912)
Arthur C Robinson, Commissioner (1912–1919)
Hugh Houston Hutchings, Commissioner (1919–1929)
Captain G. H. Frith, Commissioner (1929–1931)
Ernest Arthur Weston, Commissioner (1931–1934) 
Allen Wosley Cardinall, Commissioner (1934–1940)
Albert C. Panton Snr, Acting Commissioner (1940–1941)
John Perry Jones, Commissioner (1941–1946)
Ivor Otterbein Smith, Commissioner (1946–1952)
Andrew Morris Gerrard, Commissioner (1952–1956)
Alan Hillard Donald, Commissioner (1956–1959), administrator (1959–1960)
Jack Rose, administrator (1960–1964)
John Alfred Cumber Kt, administrator (1964–1968)
Athelstan Charles Ethelwulf Long, administrator (1968–1971), Governor (1971–1972)
Kenneth Roy Crook, Governor (1972–1974)
Thomas Russell, Governor (1974–1982)
George Peter Lloyd, Governor (1982–1987)
Alan James Scott, Governor (1987–1992)
Michael Edward John Gore, Governor (1992–1995)
John Wynne Owen, Governor (1995–1999)
Peter Smith, Governor (1999–2002)
Leaders of government business
Thomas Jefferson, Leader of government business (1992–1994)
Truman Bodden, Leader of government business (1994–2000)
Kurt Tibbetts, Leader of government business (2000–2001)

British Dominica
Governors
Louis Cools-Lartigue, Governor (1968–1978)
Prime ministers
Patrick John, Prime minister (1974–1979)

British Grenada
Governors
Premiers, Prime ministers
Eric Gairy, Premier (1967–1974), Prime minister (1974–1978)

Colony of Jamaica
Governors
Augustus William Lawson Hemming, Governor (1898–1904)
Sydney Olivier, Acting Governor (1904)
Hugh Clarence Bourne, Acting Governor (1904)
James Alexander Swettenham, Governor (1904–1907)
Hugh Clarence Bourne, Acting Governor (1907)
Sydney Olivier, Acting Governor (1907–1913)
Philip Clark Cork, Acting Governor (1913)
William Henry Manning, Governor (1913–1918)
Robert Johnstone, Acting Governor (1918)
Leslie Probyn, Governor (1918–1924)
Herbert Bryan, Acting Governor (1924)
Samuel Herbert Wilson, Governor (1924–1925)
Herbert Bryan, Acting Governor (1925)
Arthur Jeff, Acting Governor (1925–1926)
Reginald Edward Stubbs, Governor (1926–1932)
Arthur Jelf, Acting Governor (1932)
Alexander Ransford Slater, Governor (1932–1934)
A. S. Jeef, Acting Governor (1934)
Edward Brandis Denham, Governor (1934–1938)
Charles Campbell Woolley, Acting Governor (1938)
Arthur Richards, Governor (1938–1943)
William Henry Flinn, Acting Governor (1943)
John Huggins, Governor (1943–1951)
Hugh Mackintosh Foot, Governor (1951–1957)
Kenneth Blackburne, Governor (1957–1962)

British Leeward Islands
Governors
Henry Hesketh Bell, Governor (1912–1916)
Gordon James Lethem, Governor (1936–1941)

Montserrat, overseas territory
Governors
Dennis Raleigh Gibbs, administrator (1964–1971)
Willoughby Harry Thompson, Governor (1971–1974)
Norman Derek Matthews, Governor (1974–1976)
Gwilyum Wyn Jones, Governor (1977–1980)
David Kenneth Hay Dale, Governor (1980–1984)
Arthur Christopher Watson, Governor (1985–1987)
Christopher J. Turner, Governor (1987–1990)
David G. P. Taylor, Governor (1990–1993)
Frank Savage, Governor (1993–1997)
Tony Abbott, Governor (1997–2001)
Chief ministers
William Henry Bramble, Chief minister (1960–1970)
Percival Austin Bramble, Chief minister (1970–1978)
John Osborne, Chief minister (1978–1991)
Reuben Meade, Chief minister (1991–1996)
Bertrand Osborne, Chief minister (1996–1997)
David Brandt, Chief minister (1997–2001)

Saint Vincent and the Grenadines
Administrators, Governors	
Arthur Grimble, administrator (1933–1936)
Hywel George, Governor (1967–1970)
Rupert John, Governor (1970–1976)
Sydney Gun-Munro, Governor (1976–1979), Governor general (1979–1985)
Chief ministers, Premiers
Milton Cato, Chief minister (1967–1969), Premier (1969–1972)
Milton Cato, Premier (1974–1984)

Saint Christopher-Nevis-Anguilla
Governors
Milton Allan, Governor (1969–1975)
Probyn Ellsworth-Innis, Governor (1975–1981)

Saint Christopher and Nevis
Governors
Probyn Ellsworth-Innis, Governor (1975–1981)
Clement Arrindell, Governor (1981–1995)
Premiers
Robert Bradshaw, Premier (1966–1978)
Paul Southwell, Premier (1978–1979)
Lee Moore, Premier (1979–1980)
Kennedy Simmonds, Premier (1980–1995)

Saint Lucia
Governors
Frederick Clarke, Governor (1967–1971)
Allen Montgomery Lewis, Governor (1974–1979), Governor general (1979–1980)
Premiers
John Compton, Premier (1964–1979)

Trinidad and Tobago
Governors
Arthur George Murchison Fletcher, Governor (1936–1938)

Turks and Caicos Islands, overseas territory
Commissioners
Geoffrey Peter St. Aubyn, Commissioner (1899–1901)
William Douglas Young, Commissioner (1901–1905)
Frederick Henry Watkins, Commissioner (1905–1914)
George Whitfield Smith, Commissioner (1914–1923)
Harold Ernest Phillips, Commissioner (1923–1932)
Hugh Houston Hutchings, Commissioner (1933–1934)
Frank Cecil Clarkson, Commissioner (1934–1936)
Hugh Charles Norwood Hill, Commissioner (1936–1940)
Edwin Porter Arrowsmith, Commissioner (1940–1946)
Cyril Eric Wool-Lewis, Commissioner (1947–1952)
Peter Bleackley, Commissioner (1952–1955)
Ernest Gordon Lewis, Commissioner (1955–1958)
Geoffrey Colin Guy, Commissioner (1958–1959)
Administrators
Geoffrey Colin Guy, administrator (1959–1965)
Robert Everard Wainwright, administrator (1965)
John Anthony Golding, administrator (1965–1967)
Robert Everard Wainwright, administrator (1967–1971)
Alexander Graham Mitchell, administrator (1971–1973)
Governors
Alexander Graham Mitchell, Governor (1973–1975)
Arthur Christopher Watson, Governor (1975–1978)
John Clifford Strong, Governor (1978–1982)
Christopher J. Turner, Governor (1982–1987)
Michael J. Bradley, Governor (1987–1993)
Martin Bourke, Governor (1993–1996)
John Kelly, Governor (1996–2000)
Mervyn Jones, Governor (2000–2002)
Chief ministers, Premiers
James Alexander George Smith McCartney, Chief minister (1976–1980)
Oswald Skippings, Chief minister (1980)
Norman Saunders, Chief minister (1980–1985)
Nathaniel Francis, Chief minister (1985–1986)
Oswald Skippings, Chief minister (1988–1991)
Washington Misick, Chief minister (1991–1995)
Derek Hugh Taylor, Chief minister (1995–2003)

British Virgin Islands, overseas territory
Administrators, Governors
Nathaniel George Cookman, administrator (1896–1903)
Robert Stephen Earl, administrator (1903–1910)
Thomas Leslie Hardtman Jarvis, administrator (1910–1919)
Herbert Walter Peebles, administrator (1919–1922)
R. Hargrove, administrator (1922–1923)
Otho Lewis Hancock, administrator (1923–1926)
Frank Cecil Clarkson, administrator (1926–1934)
Donald Percy Wailling, administrator (1934–1946)
John Augustus Cockburn Cruikshank, administrator (1946–1954)
Henry Anthony Camillo Howard, administrator (1954–1956)
Geoffrey Pole Allesbrook, administrator (1956–1959)
Gerald Jackson Bryan, administrator (1959–1962)
Ian Thomson, administrator (1967–1971)
Walter Wilkinson Wallace, Governor (1974–1978)
James Alfred Davidson, Governor (1978–1982)
Martin Samuel Staveley, administrator (1962–1967)
Ian Thomson, administrator (1967–1971)
Derek George Cudmore, Governor (1971–1974)
Walter Wilkinson Wallace, Governor (1974–1978)
James Alfred Davidson, Governor (1978–1982)
David Robert Barwick, Governor (1982–1986)
Mark Herdman, Governor (1986–1991)
Peter Penfold, Governor (1991–1995)
David Mackilligin, Governor (1995–1998)
Frank Savage, Governor (1998–2002)
Chief ministers
Hamilton Lavity Stoutt, Chief minister (1967–1971)
Willard Wheatley, Chief minister (1971–1979)
Hamilton Lavity Stoutt, Chief minister (1979–1983)
Cyril Romney, Chief minister (1983–1986)
Hamilton Lavity Stoutt, Chief minister (1986–1995)
Ralph T. O'Neal, Chief minister (1995–2003)

British Windward Islands
Governors
Ralph Champneys Williams, Governor (1906–1909)
James Hayes Sadler (colonial administrator)James Hayes Sadler, Governor (1909–1914)
George Haddon-Smith, Governor (1914–1923)
Selwyn MacGregor Grier, Governor (1935–1937)

Mediterranean

British Cyprus
High commissioners, Governors
Hamilton Goold-Adams, High commissioner (1911–1915)
Herbert Richmond Palmer, Governor (1933–1939)

Akrotiri and Dhekelia, sovereign base areas
 Administrators
Bill Rimmer, administrator (2000–2003)

Gibraltar, Crown colony since 1830, then dependent territory since 1981
Governors
George White, Governor (1900–1905)
Frederick Forestier-Walker, Governor (1905–1910)
Archibald Hunter, Governor (1910–1913)
Herbert Miles, Governor (1913–1918)
Horace Smith-Dorrien, Governor (1918–1923)
Charles Monro, Governor (1923–1928)
Alexander Godley, Governor (1928–1933)
Charles Harington, Governor (1933–1938)
Edmund Ironside, Governor (1938–1939)
Clive Gerard Liddell, Governor (1939–1941)
John Vereker, Governor (1941–1942)
Noel Mason-Macfarlane, Governor (1942–1944)
Ralph Eastwood, Governor (1944–1947)
Kenneth Anderson, Governor (1947–1952)
Gordon MacMillan, Governor (1952–1955)
Harold Redman, Governor (1955–1958)
Charles Keightley, Governor (1958–1962)
Alfred Dudley Ward, Governor (1962–1965)
Gerald Lathbury, Governor (1965–1969)
Varyl Begg, Governor (1969–1973)
John Grandy, Governor (1973–1978)
William Jackson, Governor (1978–1982)
David Williams, Governor (1982–1985)
Peter Terry, Governor (1985–1989)
Derek Reffell, Governor (1989–1993)
John Chapple, Governor (1993–1995)
Hugo White, Governor (1995–1997)
Richard Luce, Governor (1997–2000)
Paul Speller, Acting Governor (2000)
David Durie, Governor (2000–2003)
Chief ministers
Robert Peliza, Chief minister (1969–1972)
Joshua Hassan, Chief minister (1972–1987)

Malta Colony
Governors
Francis Grenfell, Governor (1899–1903)
Charles Clarke, Governor (1903–1907)
Henry Grant, Governor (1907–1909)
Leslie Rundle, Governor (1909–1915)	
Paul Methuen, Governor (1915–1919)
Herbert Plumer, Governor (1919–1924)
Walter Congreve, Governor (1924–1927)
John Philip Du Cane, Governor (1927–1931)
David Campbell, Governor (1931–1936)		
Charles Bonham-Carter, Governor (1936–1940)
William Dobbie, Governor (1940–1942)
John Vereker, Governor (1942–1944)
Edmond Schreiber, Governor (1944–1946)
Francis Douglas, Governor (1946–1949)
Gerald Creasy, Governor (1949–1954)
Robert Laycock, Governor (1954–1959)
Guy Grantham, Governor (1959–1962)
Maurice Henry Dorman, Governor (1962–1964)

North America

Newfoundland Colony
Governors
Henry Edward McCallum, Governor (1898–1901)
Charles Cavendish Boyle, Governor (1901–1904)
William MacGregor, Governor (1904–1907)

Dominion of Newfoundland
Governors
William MacGregor, Governor (1907–1909)
Ralph Champneys Williams, Governor (1909–1913)
Walter Edward Davidson, Governor (1913–1917)
Charles Alexander Harris, Governor (1917–1922)
William Allardyce, Governor (1922–1928)
John Middleton, Governor (1928–1932)
Prime ministers
Edward Patrick Morris, Prime minister (1909–1917)

Oceania

Australia
Governors general
Thomas Denman, Governor general (1911–1914)
Ronald Munro-Ferguson, Governor general (1914–1920)
Prime ministers
Andrew Fisher, Prime minister (1910–1913)
Joseph Cook, Prime minister (1913–1914)
Andrew Fisher, Prime minister (1914–1915)

Bermuda, overseas territory
Governors
George Digby Barker, Governor (1896–1901)
Henry LeGuay Geary, Governor (1902–1904)
Robert M. Steward, Governor (1904–1907)
Josceline Wodehouse, Governor (1907–1908)
Walter Kitchener, Governor (1908–1912)
George Bullock, Governor (1912–1917)
James Willcocks, Governor (1917–1922)
J. J. Asser, Governor (1922–1927)
Louis Bols, Governor (1927–1931)
Thomas Cubitt, Governor (1931–1936)
Reginald Hildyard, Governor (1936–1939)
Denis Bernard, Governor (1939–1941)
Edward Knollys, Governor (1941–1943)
David Cecil, Governor (1943–1945)
William Addis, Acting Governor (1945–1946)
Ralph Leatham, Governor (1946–1949)
Alexander Hood, Governor (1949–1955)
John Woodall, Governor (1955–1959)
Julian Gascoigne, Governor (1959–1964)
Roland Robinson, Governor (1964–1972)
Richard Sharples, Governor (1972–1973)
Edwin Leather, Governor (1973–1977)
Peter Lloyd, Acting Governor (1977)
Peter Ramsbotham, Governor (1977–1980)
Peter Lloyd, Acting Governor (1981)
Richard Posnett, Governor (1981–1983)
Mark Herdman, Acting Governor (1983)
John Morrison, Governor (1983–1988)
Desmond Langley, Governor (1988–1992)
David Waddington, Governor (1992–1997)
Thorold Masefield, Governor (1997–2001)
Premiers
Henry Tucker, Government leader (1968–1971)
Edward Richards, Government leader (1971–1973), Premier (1973–1975)
John Henry Sharpe, Premier (1975–1977)
David Gibbons, Premier (1977–1982)
John Swan, Premier (1982–1995) 
David Saul, Premier (1995–1997)
Pamela Gordon, Premier (1997–1998)
Jennifer M. Smith, Premier (1998–2003)

Gilbert and Ellice Islands
Resident commissioners
Edward Carlyon Eliot, Resident commissioner
Valdemar Jens Andersen, Resident commissioner (1962–1970)
John Osbaldiston Field, Resident commissioner (1970–1972), the Governor (1972–1973)

Gilbert Islands
Governors
John Hilary Smith, Governor (1973–1978)
Reginald James Wallace, Governor (1978–1979)
Chief ministers
Naboua Ratieta, Chief minister (1974–1978)
Ieremia Tabai, Chief minister (1978–1979)

Ellice Islands
Commissioners
Thomas H. Laying, Commissioner (1975–1978)
Chief ministers
Toaripi Lauti, Chief minister (1975–1978)

Falkland Islands
Governors
William Grey-Wilson, Governor (1897–1904)
William Lamond Allardyce, Governor (1904–1915)
William Douglas Young, Governor (1915–1920)
John Middleton, Governor (1920–1927)
Arnold Weinholt Hodson, Governor (1927–1931)
James O'Grady, Governor (1931–1934)
Herbert Henniker-Heaton, Governor (1935–1941)
Allan Wolsey Cardinall, Governor (1941–1946)
Geoffrey Miles Clifford, Governor (1946–1954)
Oswald Raynor Arthur, Governor (1954–1957)
Edwin Porter Arrowsmith, Governor (1957–1964)
Cosmo Dugal Patrick Thomas Haskar, Governor (1964–1970)
Ernest Gordon Lewis, Governor (1971–1975)
Neville Arthur Irwin French, Governor (1975–1977)
James Roland Walter Parker, Governor (1977–1980)
Rex Hunt, Governor (1980–1982)Occupation by ArgentinaJeremy Moore, Commander (1982)
Rex Hunt, Commissioner (1982–1985)
Gordon Wesley Jewkes, Governor (1985–1988)
William Hugh Fullerton, Governor (1988–1992)
David Everard Tatham, Governor (1992–1996)
Richard Ralph, Governor (1996–1999)
Donald Lamont, Governor (1999–2002)
Chief executives
David G. P. Taylor, Chief executive (1983–1987)
Brian Cummings, Chief executive (1987–1988)
Colin Redston, Acting Chief executive (1988)
Rex Browning, Acting Chief executive (1988)
David G. P. Taylor, Interim Chief executive (1988–1989)
Ronald Sampson, Chief executive (1989–1994)
Andrew Gurr, Chief executive (1994–1999)
Michael Blanch, Chief executive (2000–2003)

Colony of Fiji
Governors
Ernest Sweet-Escott, Governor (1912–1918)

British Indian Ocean Territory (Chagos Archipelago), overseas territory
Commissioners
Hugh Norman-Walker, Commissioner (1967–1969)

Pitcairn Islands, overseas territory
Governors
Arthur Galsworthy, Governor (1970–1973)
David Aubrey Scott, Governor (1973–1975)
Harold Smedley, Governor (1976–1980)
Richard Stratton, Governor (1980–1984)
Terence Daniel O'Leary, Governor (1984–1987)
Robin Byatt, Governor (1987–1990)
David Moss, Governor (1990–1994)
Robert John Alston, Governor (1994–1998)
Martin Williams, Governor (1998–2001)
Magistrates
James Russell McCoy, President of the Council (1897–1904)
William Alfred Young, President of the Council (1904)
James Russell McCoy, Chief magistrate (1904–1906)
Arthur Herbert Young, Chief magistrate (1907)
William Alfred Young, Chief magistrate (1908)
Matthew Edmond McCoy, Chief magistrate (1909)
Gerard Bromley Robert Christian, Chief magistrate (1910–1919)
Charles Richard Parkin Christian, Chief magistrate (1920)
Frederick Martin Christian, Chief magistrate (1921)
Charles Richard Parkin Christian, Chief magistrate (1922)
Edgar Allen Christian, Chief magistrate (1923–1924)
Charles Richard Parkin Christian, Chief magistrate (1925)
Edgar Allen Christian, Chief magistrate (1926–1929)
Arthur Herbert Young, Chief magistrate (1930–1931)
Edgar Allen Christian, Chief magistrate (1932)
Charles Richard Parkin Christian, Chief magistrate (1933–1934)
Edgar Allen Christian, Chief magistrate (1935–1939)
Andrew Clarence David Young, Chief magistrate (1940)
Frederick Martin Christian, Chief magistrate (1941)
Charles Richard Parkin Christian, Chief magistrate (1942)
Frederick Martin Christian, Chief magistrate (1943)
Charles Richard Parkin Christian, Chief magistrate (1944)
Norris Henry Young, Chief magistrate (1945–1948)
Charles Richard Parkin Christian, Chief magistrate (1949)
Warren Clive Christian, Chief magistrate (1950–1951)
John Lorenzo Christian, Chief magistrate (1952–1954)
Charles Richard Parkin Christian, Chief magistrate (1955–1957)
Warren Clive Christian, Chief magistrate (1958–1960)
John Lorenzo Christian, Chief magistrate (1961–1966)
Pervis Ferris Young, Chief magistrate (1967–1975)
Ivan Christian, Chief magistrate (1975–1984)
Brian Young, Chief magistrate (1984–1991)
Jay Warren, Chief magistrate (1991–1999)
Steve Christian, Mayor (1999–2004)

Saint Helena and Dependencies, overseas territory
Governors
Dermod Murphy, Governor (1968–1971)
Thomas Oates, Governor (1971–1976)
Geoffrey Colin Guy, Governor (1976–1981)
John Dudley Massingham, Governor (1981–1984)
David Hollamby, Governor (1999–2004)
Ascension, dependency of Saint Helena
Administrators
M. E. Wainwright, administrator (1964–1966)
Anthony G.A. Beyts, administrator (1966–1967)
H. W. D. McDonald, administrator (1968–1973)
Geoffrey Colin Guy, administrator (1973–1976)
G. McDonald, administrator (1976–1977)
G. B. Kendal, administrator (1977)
Simon Gillett, administrator (1977–1979)
P. Duncan, administrator (1979–1980)
Bernard Edward Pauncefort, administrator (1980–1982)
I. G. Thow, administrator (1982–1984)
Michael T. S. Blick, administrator (1984–1989)
J. J. Beale, administrator (1989 –1991)
Brian Norman Connelly, administrator (1991–1995)
Roger C. Huxley, administrator (1995–1999)
Geoffrey Fairhurst, administrator (1999–2002)
Tristan da Cunha, dependency of Saint Helena
Administrators

South America

British Guiana
Governors
Walter Egerton, Governor (1912–1917)
Edward Brandis Denham, Governor (1930–1935)
Geoffry Northcote, Governor (1935–1937)
Wilfrid Edward Francis Jackson, Governor (1937–1941)

United States territories
Central America
List of governors of the Panama Canal Zone
Military Governors (1904–1914) 
Major general George Whitefield Davis, Military governor (1904–1905)
Charles Edward Magoon, Military governor (1905–1906)
Richard Reid Rogers, Military governor (1906–1907)
Joseph Clay Stiles Blackburn, Military governor (1907–1909)
Maurice Thatcher, Military governor (1910–1913)
Richard Lee Metcalfe, Military governor (1913–1914)
Military and Civil Governors (1914–1924)
George Washington Goethals, 1st governor (1914–1917)
Chester Harding (governor), 2nd governor (1917–1921)
Jay Johnson Morrow, 3rd governor (1921–1924)
Civil Governors (1924–1979)
Brigadier general Meriwether Lewis Walker, 4th governor (1924–1928)
Harry Burgess, 5th governor (1928–1932)
Major general Julian Larcombe Schley, 6th governor (1932–1936)
Clarence S. Ridley, 7th governor (1936–1940)
Glen Edgar Edgerton, 8th governor (1940–1944)
Major general Joseph Cowles Mehaffey, 9th governor (1944–1948)
Brigadier general Francis K. Newcomer, 10th governor (1948–1952)
Major general John States Seybold, 11th governor (1952–1956)
William Everett Potter, 12th governor (1956–1960)
William Arnold Carter, 13th governor (1960–1962)
Robert John Fleming, 14th governor (1962–1967)
Walter Philip Leber, 15th governor (1967–1971)
David Stuart Parker, 16th governor (1971–1975)
Major general Harold Parfitt, 17th governor (1975–1979)
Administrators of the Panama Canal Commission
Dennis P. McAuliffe, 1st Administrator of the Panama Canal Commission (1979–1989)
Gilberto Guardia Fabrega, 2nd Administrator of the Panama Canal Commission (1989–1996)
Alberto Aleman Zubieta, 3rd Administrator of the Panama Canal Commission (1996–2012)

Caribbean Sea
List of colonial governors of Cuba
American Suzerainty
Major general Leonard Wood, Military Governor of Cuba (1899–1902)
Republic of Cuba (1902–1959)
American Occupation (1906–1909)
William Howard Taft, 1st Provisional Governor of Cuba (1906); 27th President of the United States (1909–1913)
Charles Edward Magoon, 2ndProvisional Governor of Cuba (1906–1920)

Puerto Rico, unincorporated territory
U.S. Military government
George Whitefield Davis, 4th Military governor (1899–1900)
Post-Foraker Act of 1900 (1900–1949)
Charles Herbert Allen, 1st U.S. civil governor (1900–1901)
William Henry Hunt (judge), Governor (1001–1904)
Beekman Winthrop, Governor (1904–1907)
Regis Henri Post, Governor (1907–1909)
George Radcliffe Colton, Governor (6 Nov 1909–15 Nov 1913)
Arthur Yager, Governor (15 Nov 1913–15 May 1921)
José Eladio Benedicto y Géigel, acting Governor (15 May 1921–30 Jul 1921)
Emmet Montgomery Reily, Governor (30 Jul 1921 – Mar 1923)
Juan Bernardo Huyke, acting Governor (Mar 1923-6 Apr 1923)
Horace Mann Towner, Governor (6 Apr 1923–29 Sep 1929)
James Rumsey Beverley, acting Governor
Theodore Roosevelt Jr., Governor (7 Oct 1929–30 Jan 1932)
James Rumsey Beverley, acting Governor (30 Jan 1932-1 Jul 1933)
Robert Hayes Gore, Governor (1 Jul 1933-12 Jan 1934)
Benjamin Jason Horton, acting Governor (12 Jan 1934-5 Feb 1934)
Blanton Winship, Governor (5 Feb 1934-25 Jun 1939)
José Enrique Colom Martínez, acting Governor (25 Jun 1939-11 Sep 1939)
William Daniel Leahy, Governor (11 Sep 1939-28 Nov 1940)
José Miguel Gallardo, acting Governor (28 Nov 1940-3 Feb 1941)
Guy Jacob Swope, acting Governor (3 Feb 1941-24 Jul 1941)
José Miguel Gallardo, acting Governor (24 Jul 1941–19 Sep 1941)
Rexford Guy Tugwell, Governor (19 Sep 1941-3 Sep 1946)
Jesús Toribio Piñero, Governor (3 Sep 1946-2 Jan 1949)
Governors under the Constitution of the Commonwealth of Puerto Rico (1949–present)
Luis Muñoz Marín, Governor (2 Jan 1949-2 Jan 1965)
Roberto Sánchez Vilella, Governor (1965–1969)
Luis A. Ferré, Governor (1969–1973)
Rafael Hernández Colón, Governor (1973–1977)
Carlos Romero Barceló, Governor (1977–1985)
Rafael Hernández Colón, Governor (1985–1993)
Pedro Rosselló, Governor (1993–2001)

United States Virgin Islands, unincorporated territory Purchased from Denmark by the United States (22 Dec 1916). 
Governors U.S. sovereignty, end of Danish administration (31 Mar 1917)
31 Mar 1917–30 Jan 1931 Administered by U.S. Navy.
Captain (USN) Edwin Taylor Pollock, acting Governor (31 Mar 1917–8 Apr 1917)
James Harrison Oliver, Governor (1917–1919)
Joseph Wallace Oman, Governor (8 Apr 1919–26 Apr 1921)
Sumner Ely Wetmore Kittelle, Governor (1921–1922)
Henry Hughes Hough, Governor (16 Sep 1922–3 Dec 1923)
Philip Williams, Governor (1923–1925)
Martin Edward Trench, Governor (12 Sep 1925–6 Jan 1927)
Waldo A. Evans, Governor (1927–1931) Administered by U.S. Department of Interior (30 Jan 1931–4 Jan 1971)
Paul Martin Pearson, Governor (18 Mar 1931–23 Jul 1935)
Robert Herrick, acting for Pearson (23 Jul 1935–21 Aug 1935)
Lawrence William Cramer, Governor (1935–1940)
Robert Morss Lovett, Acting Governor (14 Dec 1940–3 Feb 1941)
Charles Harwood, Governor (1941–1945) Water Island is purchased by the U.S (19 Jun 1944).
William H. Hastie, Governor (17 May 1946–30 Nov 1949)
Morris Fidanque de Castro, cting Governor (30 Nov 1949–24 Mar 1950), Governor (24 Mar 1950 – 9 April 1954)
Archibald "Archie" A. Alexander, Governor (9 Apr 1954–31 Aug 1955)
Charles Kenneth Claunch, acting Governor (31 Aug 1955 – 17 October 1955)
Walter Arthur Gordon, Governor (17 Oct 1955–25 Sep 1958)
John David Merwin, Governor (1958–1961)
Ralph Moses Paiewonsky, Governor (5 Apr 1961–12 Feb 1969)
Cyril King, Acting Governor (1969)
Melvin H. Evans, Governor (1969–1975)
Cyril King, Governor (1975–1978)
Juan Francisco Luis, Governor (1978–1987)
Alexander A. Farrelly, Governor (1987–1995)
Roy L. Schneider, Governor (1995–1999)
Charles Wesley Turnbull, Governor (1999–2007)

Pacific Ocean
United States territorial acquisitionsPresidentsAmerican Samoa, unincorporated territory
Governors
Benjamin Franklin Tilley, Commandant (1900–1901)
Uriel Sebree, Commandant (1901–1902)
Henry Minett, Acting Commandant (1902–1903)
Edmund Beardsley Underwood, Commandant, Governor (1903–1905)
Charles Brainard Taylor Moore, Governor (1905–1908)
John Frederick Parker, Governor (1908–1910)
William Michael Crose, Governor (1910–1913)
Nathan Post, Acting Governor (1913)
Clark Daniel Stearns, Governor (1913–1914)
Nathan Post, Acting Governor (1914)
Charles Armijo Woodruff, Acting Governor (1914–1915)
John Martin Poyer, Governor (1915–1919)
Warren Terhune, Governor (1919–1920)
Waldo A. Evans, Governor (1920–1922)
Edwin Taylor Pollock, Governor (1922–1923)
Edward Stanley Kellogg, Governor (1923–1925)
Henry Francis Bryan, Governor (1925–1927)
Stephen Victor Graham, Governor (1927–1929)
Gatewood Lincoln, Governor (1929–1931)
James Sutherland Spore, Acting Governor (1931)
Arthur Emerson, Acting Governor (1931–1931)
Gatewood Lincoln, Governor (1931–1932)
George Landenberger, Governor (1932–1934)
Thomas C. Latimore, Acting Governor (1934)
Otto Dowling, Governor (1934–1936)
Thomas Benjamin Fitzpatrick, Acting Governor (1936)
MacGillivray Milne, Governor (1936–1938)
Edward Hanson, Governor (1938–1940)
Jesse Wallace, Acting Governor (1940)
Laurence Wild, Governor (1940–1942)
Henry Louis Larsen, Military Governor (1942)
John Gould Moyer, Governor (1942–1944)
Allen Hobbs, Governor (1944–1945)
Ralph Hungerford, Governor (1945)
Samuel Canan, Acting Governor (1945)
Harold Houser, Governor (1945–1947)
Vernon Huber, Governor (1947–1949)
Thomas Darden, Governor (1949–1951)
Phelps Phelps, Governor (1951–1952)
John C. Elliott, Governor (1952)
James Arthur Ewing, Governor (1952–1953)
Lawrence M. Judd, Governor (1953)
Richard Barrett Lowe, Governor (1953–1956)
Peter Tali Coleman, Governor (1956–1961)
H. Rex Lee, Governor (1961–1967)
Owen Aspinall, Governor (1967–1969)
John Morse Haydon, Governor (1969–1974)
Frank Mockler, Acting Governor (1974–1975)
Earl B. Ruth, Governor (1975–1976)
Frank Barnett, Governor (1976–1977)
H. Rex Lee, Governor (1977–1978)
Peter Tali Coleman, Governor (1978–1985)
A. P. Lutali, Governor (1985–1989)
Peter Tali Coleman, Governor (1989–1993)
A. P. Lutali, Governor (1993–1997)
Tauese Sunia, Governor (1997–2003)

Baker Island unincorporated territory.
American Equatorial Islands Colonization Project Formally claimed by U.S. (13 May 1936). Colonized by U.S. (2 Apr 1935–31 Jan 1942). 
Heads of the Baker, Howland and Jarvis Islands Colonization Scheme
William T. Miller, Superintendent of Airways Bureau of Air Commerce (Mar 1935 – May 1936) Under United States Department of Commerce to 13 May 1936).
Richard Blackburn Black, field representative Division of Territories and Island Possessions (May 1936 – Feb 1942) Administered by United States Department of the Interior (13 May 1936–27 Jun 1974).
Island Leaders
Carl Summers (2 Apr 1935–18 Apr 1935)
Abraham Piianaia (19 Jun 1935–19 Jan 1936) 
Herbert Hooper (19 Jan 1936–18 Jun 1936)
Abraham Piianaia (18 Jun 1936–26 Oct 1936)
Albert K. Akana (26 Oct 1936–24 Jun 1937)
Charles A. Ahia (24 Jun 1937–17 Nov 1937)
Theodore Akana (17 Nov 1937–23 Jul 1938)
Edward Mike McCorriston (23 Jul 1938–1 Dec 1938)
Bernard Akana (2 Dec 1938–20 Mar 1939)
Louis Suares (20 Mar 1939–10 Mar 1940)
Melvin Paoa (10 Mar 1940–24 Jul 1940)
Karl Jensen (24 Jul 1940–25 Mar 1941)
Ernest W. Rankin (25 Mar 1941–28 Jul 1941)
Walter Burke (28 Jul 1941–31 Jan 1942)
Island Commanders (Occupied by U.S. military forces, Baker Naval Air Station) (1 Sep 1943 – May 1944).
Edward Aiken Flanders, 804th Aviation Engineer Battalion (1 Sep 1943–1943)
W.J. Jennings (c.1943)

Guam, an unincorporated territoryAmerican Naval governors (1899–1941)
Admiral Richard P. Leary, Naval governor (1899–1900)
William Edwin Safford, acting Naval governor (1900)
Admiral Seaton Schroeder, Naval governor (1900–1903)
Rear Admiral William Swift, acting Naval governor (1903)
Lieutenant commander William Elbridge Sewell, Naval governor (1903–1904)
Admiral Frank Herman Schofield, acting Naval governor (1904)
Commander Raymond Stone, acting Naval governor (1904)
Commander George Leland Dyer, Naval governor (1904–1905)
Admiral Luke McNamee, Naval governor (1905–1906)
Captain Templin Potts, Naval governor (1906–1907)
Admiral Luke McNamee, acting Naval governor (1907)
Captain Edward John Dorn, Naval governor (1907–1910)
Captain Frank Freyer, Naval governor (1910–1911)
Commodore George Salisbury, Naval governor (1911–1912)
Admiral Robert Coontz, Naval governor (1912–1913)
Captain Alfred Walton Hinds, Naval governor (1913–1914)
Captain William John Maxwell, Naval governor (1914–1916)
Captain William P. Cronan, acting Naval governor (1916)
Edward Simpson, acting Naval governor (1916)
Roy Campbell Smith, Naval governor (1916–1918)
Captain William Gilmer, Naval governor (1918–1919)
Captain William A. Hodgman, Naval governor (1919)
Captain William Gilmer, Naval governor (1919–1920)
Captain Ivan Wettengel, Naval governor (1920–1921)
Commander James Sutherland Spore, Naval governor (1921–1922)
Captain Adelbert Althouse, acting Naval governor (1922)
John P. Miller, acting Naval governor (1922)
Captain Adelbert Althouse, Naval governor (1922–1923)
Captain Henry Bertram Price, Naval governor (1923–1924)
Captain Alfred Winsor Brown, Naval governor (1924–1926)
Captain Lloyd Stowell Shapley, Naval governor (1926–1929)
 Willis W. Bradley, Naval governor (1929–1931)
Captain Edmund Root, Naval governor (1931–1933)
Captain George A. Alexander, Naval governor (1933–1936)
Flag officer Benjamin McCandlish, Naval governor (1936–1938)
Captain James Thomas Alexander, Naval governor (1938–1940)
Rear Admiral George McMillin, Naval governor (1940–1941)
Japanese military governors (1941–1944)
American military governors (1944–1949)
Henry Louis Larsen, 1st military governor (1944)
Henry Louis Larsen, 2nd military governor (1944–1946)
Charles Alan Pownall, 3rd military governor (1946–1949)
Appointed civilian governors (1949–1971)
Carlton Skinner, 1st civilian governor (1949–1953)
Ford Quint Elvidge, Governor (1953–1956)
William Corbett, interim Governor (1956)
Richard Barrett Lowe, Governor (1956–1959)
Marcellus Boss, interim Governor (1959–1960)
Joseph Flores, 4th appointed Governor (1960–1961)
Bill Daniel, 5th appointed Governor (1961–1963)
Manuel Flores Leon Guerrero, Governor (1963–1969)
Carlos Camacho, last appointed governor (1969–1971)
Elected governors (1971–present)
Carlos Camacho, 1st elected governor (1971–1975)
Ricardo Bordallo, Governor (1975–1979)
Paul McDonald Calvo, Governor (1979–1983)
Ricardo Bordallo, Governor (1983–1987)
Joseph Franklin Ada, 5th Governor (1987–1995)
Carl Gutierrez, Governor (1995–2003)

Howland Island unincorporated territoryAmerican Equatorial Islands Colonization Project; Formally claimed by U.S. (13 May 1936). Colonized by U.S. (2 Apr 1935–31 Jan 1942).
Island Leaders
Henry Theise (30 Mar 1935–18 Apr 1935)
James C. Kamakaiwi (30 Mar 1935–18 Apr 1935) and (26 Oct 1936–25 Jun 1937)
Joseph Anakalea (19 Jan 1936–6 Aug 1936)
Killarney Opiopio (6 Aug 1936–26 Oct 1936)
William Kaina (25 Jun 1937–16 Nov 1937)
Charles Ahia (16 Nov 1937–23 Mar 1938)
James Kinney (23 Mar 1938–30 Nov 1938)
William Tavares (30 Nov 1938–21 Mar 1939)
Eugene Burke (21 Mar 1939–10 Jun 1939)
Thomas McCorriston (10 Jun 1939–12 Oct 1939)
Francis Stillman (12 Oct 1939–9 Mar 1940)
Edward Mike McCorriston (9 Mar 1940–23 Jul 1940)
Louis Suares(23 Jul 1940–27 May 1941)
Thomas Wright Bederman(27 May 1941–31 Jan 1942)

Johnston Atoll unincorporated territory Administered by United States Department of the Navy, subject to Department of Interior (29 Dec 1934–1 Jul 1948). 
Island Commanders 
Major General (USMC) Francis B. Loomis Jr. (7 Dec 1941–1942) Naval Air Station Johnston Island, (15 Aug 1941–13 Jun 1947)
Lieutenant General (USMC) James M. Masters Sr. (1942 – Nov 1942)
Brigadier General (USMC) Richard P. Ross Jr. (Nov 1942 – Jul 1943)
Bruce T. Hemphill (Jul 1943 – Mar 1944)
August F. Penzold Jr. (Mar 1944–1944)
Thomas L. Wiper (c.1948–c.1949) Administered by United States Department of the Air Force (Johnston Island Air Force Base) (1 Jul 1948 – 1 July 1973).
Jack L. Bentley (1950s)
James L. Pasquino (2000–2001) U.S. Army Johnston Atoll Chemical Agent Disposal System (30 Jun 1990–12 Apr 2001). Administered by U.S. Air Force (1 Oct 1999–1 Jan 2004).

Midway Islands Discovered (8 Jul 1859), called "Middlebrook Islands". Annexed to the U.S. (28 Aug 1867) unincorporated territory and name changed to "Midway".
Superintendents of the Commercial Pacific Cable Station 
Benjamin W. Colley (29 Apr 1903–1906?) U.S. Navy Department assumes control and names the Commercial Pacific Cable Company as island custodians on 20 June 1903. U.S. Marine detachment garrisons Midway to protect the cable station (1904–1908).
Daniel Morrison (1906–1921)
 Island Commanders
D.B. Ventries, officer in charge (27 Mar 1940–1940)
Major (USMC) Samuel G. Taxi (Jun 1940 – Jul 1940)
Kenneth W. Benner Jul (1940–29 Sep 1940)
Harold C. Roberts (29 Sep 1940–14 Feb 1941) 
Lieutenant General (USMC) Robert H. Pepper (14 Feb 1941–1941)
Bert A. Bone 1941–(1 Aug 1941)
Cyril Thomas Simard (1 Aug 1941–1942) U.S. Naval Air Station Midway (1 Aug 1941)

Palmyra Atoll Part of the U.S. Territory of Hawaii (14 Jun 1900). Hawaii becomes a state, but Palmyra is excluded and remains as an incorporated territory, administered by U.S. Department of Interior (21 Aug 1959).
Island Commanders Administered by U.S. Navy Department (29 Dec 1934). Declared a U.S. Naval defense area, and all foreign, public and private vessels and planes were prohibited (Nov 1939).
Gordon Rowe (1941–af.Jul 1942) 
J.R. Dudley (c.Aug 1942–c.1 Feb 1943) Naval Air Station Palmyra Island (17 Aug 1941–15 Feb 1947).
R.N. Hunter (bf.1May 1943 – Nov 1943)
Bert Haddow Creighton (Nov 1943–1944?)
Walter M. Hanson (Sep 1944–Sep? 1945)

Trust Territory of the Pacific Islands was a United Nations trust territory in Micronesia administered by the United States from 1947 to 1994.
High commissioners
Edward Elliott Johnston, High commissioner (1969–1976)
Adrian P. Winkel, High commissioner (1977–1981)
Janet J. McCoy, High commissioner (1981–1987)

Northern Mariana Islands, Insular area since 24 March 1976. Formerly part of the Trust Territory of the Pacific Islands (1947–1974). 
Governors
Carlos S. Camacho, Governor (1978–1982)
Pedro Tenorio, Governor (1982–1990)
Guerrero, Governor (1990–1994)
Froilan Tenorio, Governor (1994–1998)
Pedro Tenorio, Governor (1998–2002)

Philippines
The Philippines Insurrection against Spain (23 Mar 1897 – 14 August 1898) and the United States (to 13 April 1902). Philippine Republic (12 Jun 1898–13 Apr 1902)
United States Military Government (1898–1902)
Major General (USA) Elwell Stephen Otis, 2nd American military governor (1898–1900)
Lieutenant General (USA) Arthur MacArthur Jr., American military governor (1900–1901)
Insular Government (1901–1935) 
William Howard Taft, Governor (4 Jul 1901–1 Feb 1904). Taft was the 27th President of the United States (1909–1913) End of the Philippine–American War (4 February 1899 – 2 July 1902)
Luke Edward Wright, Governor (1 Feb 1904–7 Feb 1905), Governor-general ( 7 Feb 1905–30 Mar 1906)
Henry Clay Ide, Governor-general (30 Mar 1906–19 Sep 1906) Acting governor until 2 April 1906.
James Francis Smith, Governor-general (1906–1909)
William Cameron Forbes, Governor-general (11 Nov 1909–1 Sep 1913)
Newton W. Gilbert, acting Governor-general (1 Sep 1913–6 Oct 1913)
Francis Burton Harrison, Governor-general (1913–1921)
Charles Yeater, acting Governor-general (5 Mar 1921–14 Oct 1921)
Major General (USA) Leonard Wood, Governor-general (1921–1927)
Eugene Allen Gilmore, acting Governor-general (7 Aug 1927–27 Dec 1927)
Henry L. Stimson, Governor-general (1927–1929)
Eugene Allen Gilmore, acting Governor-general (23 Feb 1929–8 Jul 1929)
Dwight F. Davis, Governor-general (1929–1932)
George Charles Butte, acting Governor-general (21 Nov 1931–9 Jan 1932), Governor-general (to 29 February 1932)
Theodore Roosevelt Jr., Governor-general (29 Feb 1932–24 Mar 1933)
John H. Holliday, acting for Roosevelt 16 Mar 1933–24 Mar 1933); Governor-general (to 15 June 1933)
William Francis "Frank" Murphy, Governor-general (15 Jun 1933–14 Nov 1935). Became High Commissioner to the Philippines (1935–1937)
Presidents of the Commonwealth of the Philippines (1935–1946)
Manuel Luis Quezon Antonio y Molina, 2nd president (15 Nov 1935–17 Mar 1942) (in Washington, D.C., exile to 1 August 1944)
José Abad Santos, acting for Quezon (17 Mar 1942–11 Apr 1942); Japanese prisoner (11 Apr–7 May 1942)
Japanese Military Governors (commanders of the 14th Army; (3 Jan 1942–2 Sep 1945)
President of the Executive Commission
Jorge Bartolomé Vargas y Celis (23 Jan 1943–14 Oct 1943)
Presidents 
José Paciano Laurel y García, 3rd president (14 Oct 1943–17 Aug 1945)
Sergio Osmeña y Suico, 4th president (1 Aug 1944–28 Jun 1946) In Washington, D.C., exile to 20 October 1944.
Manuel Roxas, 4th president (28 Jun 1946–15 Apr 1948). Roxas became the 1st president of the 3rd Philippine Republic on 4 July 1946.

Wake Island, unincorporated territory
Pan American Airways Island Managers (1935–1942)
William S. Grooch (9 May 1935-4 July 1935)
George W. Bicknell (July 1935–1936)
Stewart Acers Saunders (1936–1937)
Don Young (1937–193.)
Kenneth S. Sitton (193.–19..)
Jack C. Bonamy (1940?–1941)
Island commanders (Jan? 1941 – December 23, 1941)
Elmer B. Greey, officer-in-charge (Jan? 1941–19 Aug 1941)
Lewis A. Hohn (19 Aug 1941-15 Oct 1941)
James Patrick Sinnott Devereux (15 Oct 1941-29 Nov 1941)
Winfield Scott Cunningham (29 Nov 1941-23 Dec 1941)
Japanese Commanders (23 December 1941 – September 4, 1945)
Island commanders (4 September, 1945–194?)
Lawson H. Sanderson (4 Sep 1945-12 Sep 1945)
William Masek (12 Sep 1945-9 Oct 1945)
Earl A. Junghans (9 Oct 1945–1946?)
...? (1946?–1947)
Wake Island Area Managers of the Civil Aeronautics Administration (from 31 December 1958) Federal Aviation Agency (from 5 Feb 1962-25 Jun 1972)
...? (1 Jul 1947 – Mar 1948)
Thomas D. Musson (Mar 1948-c.1958)
Allan Andrews (19..–24 Jun 1972)
Governors (also General Counsels of the U.S. Air Force) (25 Jun 1972–present)
Jack L. Stempler, general counsel (25 Jun 1972-22 Mar 1977)
Peter B. Hamilton (3 May 1977-31 Dec 1978)
Stuart R. Reichart (20 Nov 1978-10 Jun 1981)
David Elliott Place (10 Jun 1981-2 Mar 1984)
Eugene R. Sullivan (2 Mar 1984–26 May 1986)
Kathleen A. Buck (1 Jun 1986–26 Oct 1987)
Anne Newman Foreman (8 Nov 1987–26 Sep 1989)
Roy G. Wuchitech (acting) (27 Sep 1989–1 Dec 1989)
Ann C. Peterson (4 Dec 1989–20 Jan 1993)
Myron H. Nordquist (20 Jan 1993–10 Jul 1993)
Vacant? (10 Jul 1993–22 Nov 1993)
Gilbert F. Casellas (22 Nov 1993–3 Oct 1994)
Sheila C. Cheston (3 Oct 1994 – Oct 1998)
Jeh C. Johnson (Oct 1998–31 Dec 2000)

United States occupational forces
Cuba
First Occupation of Cuba (1898–1902)
Major General (USA) Leonard Wood, 3rd U.S. Governor-General of Cuba (23 December 1899 – 20 May 1902)
Republic of Cuba (20 May 1902 – 28 September 1906) Cuba becomes a protectorate of the United States (20 May 1902–29 May 1934)
Provisional Governors 
William Howard Taft, (29 Sep 1906–13 Oct 1906) Taft was the 27th President of the United States (1909–1913).
Charles Edward Magoon, (13 Oct 1906–28 Jan 1909)
Guantanamo Bay U.S. Naval Base Leased to U.S. (10 Dec 1903–present)

United States occupation of Nicaragua (1912–1933)
U.S. Military Commanders Forces
Major General (USMC) Smedley Darlington Butler, U.S. Military Commander (31 May 1910–5 Sep 1910) De facto'' U.S. protectorate (17 Nov 1909–19 Jun 1916).
Major General (USMC) Joseph Henry Pendleton, U.S. Military Commander (4 Sep 1912–18 Oct 1912) 
Major General (USMC) Charles G. Long, U.S. Military Commander (19 Oct 1912–31 Oct 1912) 
Joseph Henry Pendleton, U.S. Military Commander (1 Nov 1912–7 Dec 1912) 
William Nessler McKelvy, U.S. Military Commander (8 Dec 1912–6 Jan 1913) 
Commanding Officers of U.S. Marine Corps Detachment, American Legation, Managua
Edward A. Greene, Commanding Officer of U.S. Marine Corps Detachment (9 Jan 1913 – 191.)
Presley M. Rixey Jr., Commanding Officer of U.S. Marine Corps Detachment (191.–1916)
Hamilton Disston South, Commanding Officer of U.S. Marine Corps Detachment (1916–16 Apr 1918) U.S. protectorate begins (19 Jun 1916)
William S. Harrison, Commanding Officer of U.S. Marine Corps Detachment (1918–1919?)
Lieutenant General (USMC) James L. Underhill, Commanding Officer of U.S. Marine Corps Detachment (1919–1921)
Nimmo Old Jr., Commanding Officer of U.S. Marine Corps Detachment (1921–30 Apr 1921)
Wilbur Thing, Commanding Officer of U.S. Marine Corps Detachment (30 Apr 1921 – 1922)
Major General (USMC) John Marston, Commanding Officer of U.S. Marine Corps Detachment (6 Mar 1922 – Mar 1924)
Lieutenant General (USMC) Thomas E. Bourke, acting? Commanding Officer of U.S. Marine Corps Detachment (1924)
Major General (USMC) Ralph S. Keyser, Commanding Officer of U.S. Marine Corps Detachment (1924 – 3 August 1925)
Post abolished (1925–1927) 
U.S. occupation (23 Dec 1926–3 Jan 1933)
Vice Admiral (USN) Clark H. Woodward, Commanding Officer of U.S. Marine Corps Detachment (20 Feb 1927–7 Mar 1927)
Major General (USMC) Logan Feland, Commanding Officer of U.S. Marine Corps Detachment (7 Mar 1927–24 Aug 1927)
Louis M. Gulick, Commanding Officer of U.S. Marine Corps Detachment (25 Aug 1927–15 Jan 1928)
Major General (USMC) Logan Feland, Commanding Officer of U.S. Marine Corps Detachment (16 Jan 1928–26 Mar 1929)
Brigadier General (USMC) Robert H. Dunlap, Commanding Officer of U.S. Marine Corps Detachment (26 Mar 1929–18 Apr 1929)
Brigadier General (USMC) Dion Williams, Commanding Officer of U.S. Marine Corps Detachment (18 Apr 1929–4 Jun 1930)
Frederic L. Bradman, Commanding Officer of U.S. Marine Corps Detachment (26 Jun 1930–26 Nov 1931)
Major General (USMC) Randolph Carter Berkeley, Commanding Officer of U.S. Marine Corps Detachment (26 Nov 1931–1 Jan 1933) U.S. Protectorate ends (2 Jan 1933)

United States occupation of Veracruz (21 April 1914 – 23 November 1914)
Rear Admiral (USN) Frank Friday Fletcher, U.S. Fleet commander (21 April 1914 – 30 April 1914)
Brigadier General (USA) Frederick Funston, commander (30 April 1914 – 23 November 1914)

United States occupation of Haiti (28 July 1915 – 1 August 1934)
Commanders, U. S. Expeditionary Forces Operating in Haiti
Admiral (USN) William Banks Caperton, commander U.S. cruiser squadron, Atlantic Fleet (28 Jul 1915–15 Aug 1915) U.S. Occupation invasion begins 9 July 1915.
Major General (USMC) Littleton Waller Tazewell Waller, (15 Aug 1915–21 Nov 1916) U.S. protectorate begins 16 September 1915. 
Major General (USMC) Eli K. Cole (22 Nov 1916–27 Nov 1917)
Major General (USMC) John Henry Russell Jr., (28 Nov 1917–6 Dec 1918) 
Brigadier General (USMC) Albertus W. Catlin, (7 Dec 1918–14 Jul 1919)
Brigadier General (USMC) Louis McCarty Little, (15 Jul 1919–1 Oct 1919)
John Henry Russell Jr., (2 Oct 1919–14 Jan 1922) 
Brigadier General (USMC) George Van Orden, (14 Jan 1922–28 Mar 1922) 
Theodore P. Kane, (29 Mar 1922–15 Nov 1923) 
Colonel (USMC) William N. McKelvy Sr., (16 Nov 1923–21 Jan 1924)
Major General (USMC) Ben Hebard Fuller, (21 Jan 1924–11 Jun 1925) 
William N. McKelvy, (12 Jun 1925–25 Jun 1925) 
Harold Courtland Snyder, (Jun 1925–29 Jul 1925) 
Ben H. Fuller, (30 Jul 1925–7 Dec 1925)
Lieuteant General (USMC) John Twiggs Myers, (8 Dec 1925–24 Jan 1928)
Presley M. Rixey Jr., (25 Jan 1928–22 Feb 1928) 
Louis Mason Gulick, (23 Feb 1928–24 Jun 1929)
Richard M. Cutts, (25 Jun 1929–11 May 1931)
Louis McCarty Little, (3 Jun 1931–15 Aug 1934) End of U.S. occupation
U.S. Envoy Extraordinary and Minister Plenipotentiary
Arthur Bailly-Blanchard, (15 Nov 1915–26 Sep 1921) 
U.S. High Commissioner to Haiti
John Henry Russell Jr., High Commissioner (11 Feb 1922–16 Nov 1930)
U.S. Envoys Extraordinary and Ministers Plenipotentiary
James Clement Dunn, acting (Apr 1922 – Feb 1924) 
George R. Merrell Jr., acting (Mar 1924 – Oct 1926)
Christian Gross, acting (Oct 1926 – Nov 1927)
Christian Gross, acting (Apr 1928 – Dec 1928)
Stuart E. Grummon, acting (Dec 1928 – Nov 1930)
Dana Gardner Munro, (16 Nov 1930–14 Sep 1932)
Norman Armour, (7 Nov 1932–4 Mar 1933)
Norman Armour, (11 Apr 1933–21 Mar 1935) End of U.S. occupation, 15 August 1934
George Anderson Gordon, (6 Sep 1935–21 Jul 1937) U.S. protectorate ends 3 May 1936.

Occupation of the Rhineland (1919–1923) U.S. zone–south-central Rhine province, Birkenfeld, and Koblenz.
Major General (USA) Joseph T. Dickman, (1 Dec 1918 – 24 January 1923) Withdrawal U.S. forces, former U.S. zone was taken over by France.

United States occupation of Iceland (16 June 1941 – 1945)
Commanders of the U.S. Occupation Forces (from 16 September 1941, Commanding General Iceland Base Command)
Major General (USMC) John Marston, Commander of the U.S. Occupation Forces (6 Aug 1941–16 Sep 1941)
Major General (USA) Charles Hartwell Bonesteel Jr., Commanding General Iceland Base Command (16 Sep 1941–18 Jun 1943)
Major General (USA) William S. Key, Commanding General Iceland Base Command (18 Jun 1943–4 Dec 1944)
Brigadier General (USA) Early Edward Walters Duncan, Commanding General Iceland Base Command (4 Dec 1944–31 Dec 1945)

Allied-occupied Austria (27 April 1945 – 27 July 1955)
High commissioners of the American Zone (Salzburg and Upper Austria)
General (USA) Mark W. Clark (5 July 1945 – 16 May 1947)
Lieutenant General (USA) Geoffrey Keyes (17 May 1947 – 19 September 1950) Beginning of Marshall Plan.
Walter J. Donnelly (20 September 1950 – 17 July 1952)
Llewellyn Thompson (17 July 1952 – 27 July 1955)

West Berlin (1945–1990) The American sector consisted of the Boroughs of Neukölln, Kreuzberg, Tempelhof, Schöneberg, Steglitz, and Zehlendorf.
Commandants of the American Zone
Major General (USA) Floyd Lavinius Parks (4 July 1945 – 2 September 1945)
Major General (USA) James M. Gavin (3 September 1945 – 10 October 1945)
Major General (USA) Ray W. Barker (11 October 1945 – 1 May 1946)
Major General (USA) Frank A. Keating (1 May 1946 – 13 May 1947)
Major General (USA) Cornelius E. Ryan (14 May 1947 – 23 September 1947)
Major General (USA) William Hesketh (24 September 1947 – 30 November 1947)
Brigadier General (USA) Frank L. Howley (1 December 1947 – 31 August 1949)
Major General (USA) Maxwell D. Taylor (31 August 1949 – 31 January 1951)
Major General (USA) Lemuel Mathewson (1 February 1951 – 2 January 1953)
Major General (USA) Thomas S. Timberman (3 January 1953 – 4 August 1954)
Major General (USA) George B. Honnen (5 August 1954 – 9 September 1955)
Major General (USA) Charles L. Dasher (10 September 1955 – 3 June 1957)
Major General (USA) Barksdale Hamlett Jr. (4 June 1957 – 15 December 1959)
Major General (USA) Ralph M. Osborne (20 December 1959 – 3 May 1961)
Major General (USA) Albert Watson II (4 May 1961 – 2 January 1963)
Major General (USA) James H. Polk (2 January 1963 – 31 August 1964)
Major General (USA) John F. Franklin Jr. (1 September 1964 – 3 June 1967)
Major General (USA) Robert G. Fergusson (3 June 1967 – 28 February 1970)
Lieutenant General (USA) George M. Seignious (28 February 1970 – 12 May 1971)
Major General (USA) William W. Cobb (12 May 1971 – 10 June 1974)
General (USA) Sam Sims Walker (10 June 1974 – 11 August 1975)
Major General (USA) Joseph C. McDonough (11 August 1975 – 7 June 1978)
Major General (USA) Calvert P. Benedict (7 June 1978 – 5 July 1981)
Major General (USA) James G. Boatner (5 July 1981 – 27 June 1984)
Major General (USA) John H. Mitchell (27 June 1984 – 1 June 1988)
Major General (USA) Raymond E. Haddock (1 June 1988 – 2 October 1990) U.S. troops were withdrawn following the German reunification in 1990.

Allied-occupied Germany (23 May 1945 – 5 May 1955)
Military Governors
General of the Army (USA) Dwight D. Eisenhower, Military Governor (8 May 1945–10 Nov 1945); 34th President of the United States 
General (USA) George S. Patton Jr., acting Military Governor (11 Nov 1945–25 Nov 1945)
General (USA) Joseph T. McNarney, Military Governor (26 Nov 1945–5 Jan 1947)
General (USA) Lucius DuBignon Clay, Military Governor (6 Jan 1947–14 May 1949) Berlin Blockade (24 Jun 1948–12 May 1949) End of four-power administration of Germany (20 Mar 1948)
Lieutenant General (USA) Clarence R. Huebner, acting Military Governor (15 May 1949–1 Sep 1949) 
High Commissioners
John J. McCloy, High Commissioner (2 Sep 1949–1 Aug 1952) 
Walter J. Donnelly, High Commissioner (1 Aug 1952–11 Dec 1952) 
Samuel Reber III, acting High Commissioner (11 Dec 1952–10 Feb 1953) 
James B. Conant, High Commissioner (10 Feb 1953–5 May 1955) End of formal Allied occupation of West Germany (5 May 1955)

Occupation of Japan, (1945–1952)
Supreme Commanders for the Allied Powers (SCAP) and (from 1 January 1947) Commanders-in-chief, Far East Command
General of the Army (USA) Douglas MacArthur, Supreme Commander for the Allied Powers (29 August 1945 – 11 April 1951) State of Japan (3 May 1947)
General (USA) Matthew Bunker Ridgway, Supreme Commander for the Allied Powers (11 Apr 1951–28 Apr 1952)

Okinawa and the Ryukyu Islands
United States Military Government of the Ryukyu Islands (1945–1950)
 Lieutenant General (USA) Simon Bolivar Buckner Jr., Military Governor (1 Apr 1945–18 Jun 1945) Killed in action.
 Lieutenant General (USA) Roy Stanley Geiger, acting Military Governor (18 Jun 1945–23 Jun 1945
General (USA) Joseph Warren Stilwell, acting Military Governor (23 Jun 1945–31 Jul 1945), Military Governor (1 Aug – 16 October 1945)
Major General (USA) Fred Clute Wallace, commanding general, Island Command Okinawa, (Jun 1945–23 Apr 1946) 
Brigadier General (USA) Lawrence A. Lawson, Military Governor (17 Oct 1945–29 Dec 1945)
Brigadier General (USA) Fremont Byron Hodson Sr., Military Governor (30 Dec 1945–26 Feb 1946)
Major General (USA) Leo Donovan, Military Governor (27 Feb 1946–21 May 1946) 
Brigadier General (USA) Frederic Lord Hayden, (24 May 1946–11 May 1948)
Major General (USA) William W. Eagles, Military Governor (12 May 1948–30 Sep 1949) 
Major General (USA) Josef R. Sheetz, Military Governor (1 Oct 1949–21 Jul 1950) 
Major General (USA) Robert Battey McClure, Military Governor (28 Jul 1950–6 Dec 1950) 
Brigadier General (USA) Harry B. Sherman, acting Military Governor (6 Dec 1950–9 Dec 1950)
Major General (USA) Robert Sprague Beightler, Military Governor (9 Dec 1950–15 Dec 1950)
United States Civil Administration of the Ryukyu Islands (1950–1972)
Governors and Commanders-in-chief, U.S. Forces Far East (in Tokyo) 
General of the Army (USA) Douglas MacArthur, Governor (15 Dec 1950–11 Apr 1951)
General (USA) Matthew Bunker Ridgway, Governor (11 Apr 1951–12 May 1952)
General (USA) Mark Wayne Clark, Governor (12 May 1952–7 Oct 1953)
General (USA) John E. Hull, Governor (7 Oct 1953–1 Apr 1955) Amami Oshima island group restored to Japan (25 Dec 1953). 
General (USA) Maxwell Davenport Taylor, Governor (1 Apr 1955–5 Jun 1955)
General (USA) Lyman Louis Lemnitzer, Governor (5 Jun 1955–30 Jun 1957)
High Commissioners
Lieutenant General (USA) James Edward Moore, High Commissioner (4 Jul 1957–30 Apr 1958) 
Lieutenant General (USA) Donald Prentice Booth, High Commissioner (1 May 1958–12 Feb 1961)
Lieutenant General (USA) Paul Wyatt Caraway, High Commissioner (16 Feb 1961–31 Jul 1964)
Lieutenant General (USA) Albert Watson II, High Commissioner (1 Aug 1964–31 Oct 1966)
Lieutenant General (USA) Ferdinand Thomas Unger, High Commissioner (2 Nov 1966–28 Jan 1968) Ryukyu Islands (except Okinawa) restored to Japan (21 Nov 1967). 
Lieutenant General (USA) James Benjamin Lampert, High Commissioner (28 Jan 1968–14 May 1972) Bonin Islands restored to Japan (26 Jun 1968). Okinawa reverts to Japanese sovereignty as a prefecture (15 May 1972).

1991 Haiti coup (19 September 1994 – 31 March 1995)
U.S. Commanders of the Multinational Forces Haiti (MNF)
Lieutenant General (USA) Henry H. Shelton, Commander of the Multinational Forces Haiti (19 Sep 1994–25 Oct 1994)
Major General (USA) David C. Meade, Commander of the Multinational Forces Haiti (25 Oct 1994–14 Jan 1995)
Lieutenant General (USA) George A. Fisher Jr., Commander of the Multinational Forces Haiti (14 Jan 1995–31 Mar 1995)
Commanders of the United Nations Mission in Haiti Force (UNMIH)
Joseph W. Kinzer (U.S.), Commander of the United Nations Mission in Haiti Force (31 Mar 1995–5 Mar 1996)

Other

New Hebrides, condominium of Britain and France
British resident commissioners
Colin Allan, Resident commissioner (1966–1973)		
John Stuart Champion, Resident commissioner (1975–1978)	
Andrew Stuart, Resident commissioner (1978–1980)
French resident commissioners
Robert Jules Amédée Langlois, Resident commissioner (1969–1974)
Robert Gauger, Resident commissioner (1974–1978)
Bernard Pottier, Resident commissioner (1978)
Jean-Jacques Robert, Resident commissioner (1978–1980)
Chief ministers
George Kalsakau, Chief minister (1977–1978)
Gérard Leymang, Chief minister (1978–1979)
Walter Lini, Chief minister (1979–1980)

See also
List of princely states of British India (alphabetical)
List of princely states of British India (by region)
Antarctic Treaty System
Chief minister

Notes

References

External links
WorldStatesmen—an online encyclopedia of the leaders of nations and territories

Territorial governors
-20th century
Territorial governors
 Territorial governors